= 1992 Yugoslav campaign in Bosnia =

Series of engagements during the Bosnian war

- Part of the Bosnian War
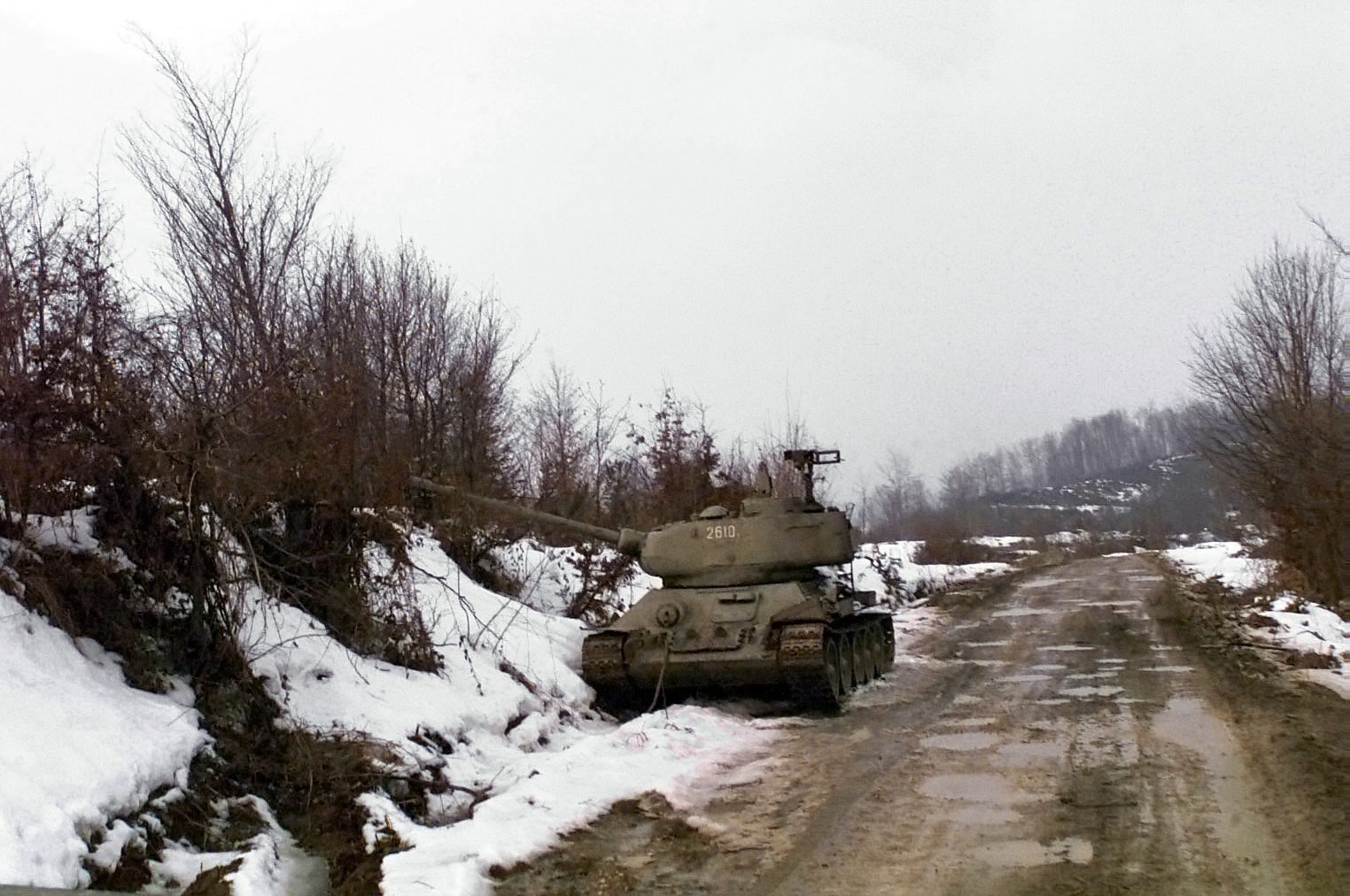
- A Serbian T-34 tank on the roadside next to a snow-covered bank during Operation Joint Endeavor.
Date	3 April – 19 May 1992
Location	Bosnia and Herzegovina
Result	Yugoslav victory: TOBiH and HV eliminated from Foča, Višegrad, Kupres, Ilidža, Prijedor, Šamac, Zvornik, Čajniče, Doboj, Brčko, Bratunac, and more; Establishment of the VRS; The JNA and HV leave Bosnia due to agreements with the UNPROFOR
Territorial changes	Republika Srpska formed as a self-proclaimed Serb state from Bosnia and Herzegovina; Republika Srpska increases its land control from 40% to 52%

Belligerents
FR Yugoslavia (Note: After all former Yugoslav federal republics except Serbia and Montenegro declared independence, the two declared the creation of a new country – the Federal Republic of Yugoslavia – on 27 April 1992.); Republika Srpska	Bosnia and Herzegovina; Herzeg-Bosnia; Croatia

Commanders and leaders
(Federal Republic of Yugoslavia) Slobodan Milošević (Federal Republic of Yugoslavia) Željko Ražnatović (Federal Republic of Yugoslavia) Vojislav Šešelj (Republika Srpska) Radovan Karadžić	(Bosnia and Herzegovina) Alija Izetbegović (surrendered) (Bosnia and Herzegovina) Sefer Halilović (Bosnia and Herzegovina) Murat Šabanović (Croatian Republic of Herzeg-Bosnia) Mate Boban (Croatian Republic of Herzeg-Bosnia) Milivoj Petković

Units involved
Yugoslav People's Army (Note: The JNA officially withdrew from Bosnia and Herzegovina on 10 May 1992. Though in reality while most JNA personnel left, personnel who are nationals of Bosnia and Herzegovina stayed despite the JNA "left" most of them who stayed, become part of the newly formed Army of Republika Srpska.); Yugoslav Ground Forces; Yugoslav Air Force; Army of Republika Srpska (from 12 May); Police of Republika Srpska; Serb Volunteer Guard; White Eagles	Territorial Defense of Bosnia and Herzegovina; Army of the Republic of Bosnia and Herzegovina; Patriotic League; Armed Forces of Croatia; Croatian Army; Croatian Defence Council; Herzeg-Bosnia Police; Croatian Defence Forces

Strength
JNA 100,000 troops VRS 40,000 (from 12 May to 19 May)	TOBiH 70,000 troops HVO 20,000; HV 15,000

Casualties and losses
Unknown	Heavy

The 1992 Yugoslav campaign in Bosnia was a series of engagements between the Yugoslav People's Army (JNA) and the Territorial Defence Force of the Republic of Bosnia and Herzegovina (TO BiH) and then the Army of the Republic of Bosnia and Herzegovina (ARBiH) during the Bosnian War. The campaign effectively started on 3 April and ended 19 May.

The war was part of the breakup of Yugoslavia. Following the Slovenian and Croatian secessions from the Socialist Federal Republic of Yugoslavia in 1991, the multi-ethnic Socialist Republic of Bosnia and Herzegovina – which was inhabited by mainly Muslim Bosniaks (44%), Orthodox Serbs (32.5%) and Catholic Croats (17%) – passed a referendum for independence on 29 February 1992. Political representatives of the Bosnian Serbs boycotted the referendum, and rejected its outcome. Anticipating the outcome of the referendum, the Assembly of the Serb People in Bosnia and Herzegovina adopted the Constitution of the Serbian Republic of Bosnia and Herzegovina on 28 February 1992. Following Bosnia and Herzegovina's declaration of independence (which gained international recognition) and following the withdrawal of Alija Izetbegović from the previously signed Cutileiro Plan (which proposed a division of Bosnia into ethnic cantons), the Bosnian Serbs, led by Radovan Karadžić and supported by the government of Slobodan Milošević and the Yugoslav People's Army (JNA), mobilised their forces inside Bosnia and Herzegovina in order to secure ethnic Serb territory. The war soon spread across the country, accompanied by ethnic cleansing.

The first clashes took place in Kupres between the Bosnian Croat Territorial Defence Force supported by the Croatian Army troops on one side and the Yugoslav People's Army. There were battles for Zvornik, Višegrad, Foča, Doboj, Prijedor and many more cities later. The JNA officially withdrew from Bosnia and Herzegovina in May 1992. In January 1992, a Bosnian Serb self-proclaimed statelet was declared. Later renamed Republika Srpska, it developed its own military as the JNA withdrew and handed over its weapons, equipment and 55,000 troops to the newly created Bosnian Serb army.^{[42][44]} On 20 May 1992 the JNA was formally dissolved, the remnants of which reformed into the military of the newly founded Federal Republic of Yugoslavia.

== Background ==
=== Breakup of Yugoslavia ===
The war came about as a result of the breakup of the Socialist Federal Republic of Yugoslavia. A crisis emerged in Yugoslavia as a result of the weakening of the confederational system at the end of the Cold War. In Yugoslavia, the national communist party, the League of Communists of Yugoslavia, lost ideological potency. Meanwhile, ethnic nationalism experienced a renaissance in the 1980s after violence in Kosovo. While the goal of Serbian nationalists was the centralisation of Yugoslavia, other nationalities aspired to the decentralisation and further federalisation of the state.

Bosnia and Herzegovina, a former Ottoman province, has historically been a multi-ethnic state. According to the 1991 census, 44% of the population considered themselves Muslim (Bosniak), 33% Serb and 17% Croat, with 6% describing themselves as Yugoslav.

In March 1989, the crisis in Yugoslavia deepened after the adoption of amendments to the Serbian Constitution allowing the government of Serbia to dominate the provinces of Kosovo and Vojvodina. Until then, Kosovo and Vojvodina's decision-making was independent, and each autonomous province had a vote at the Yugoslav federal level. Serbia, under newly elected President Slobodan Milošević, gained control over three out of eight votes in the Yugoslav presidency. With additional votes from Montenegro, Serbia was thus able to heavily influence the decisions of the federal government. This situation led to objections from the other republics and calls for the reform of the Yugoslav Federation.

At the 14th Extraordinary Congress of the League of Communists of Yugoslavia, on 20 January 1990, the delegations of the republics could not agree on the main issues facing the Yugoslav federation. As a result, the Slovene and Croatian delegates left the Congress. The Slovene delegation, headed by Milan Kučan, demanded democratic changes and a looser federation, while the Serbian delegation, headed by Milošević, opposed it.

In the first multi-party election in Bosnia and Herzegovina, in November 1990, votes were cast largely according to ethnicity, leading to the success of the Bosniak Party of Democratic Action (SDA), the Serb Democratic Party (SDS), and the Croatian Democratic Union (HDZ BiH).

Parties divided power along ethnic lines so the President of the Presidency of the Socialist Republic of Bosnia and Herzegovina was a Bosniak, the president of the Parliament was a Serb, and the prime minister a Croat. Separatist nationalist parties attained power in other republics, including Croatia and Slovenia.

=== Beginning of the Yugoslav Wars ===
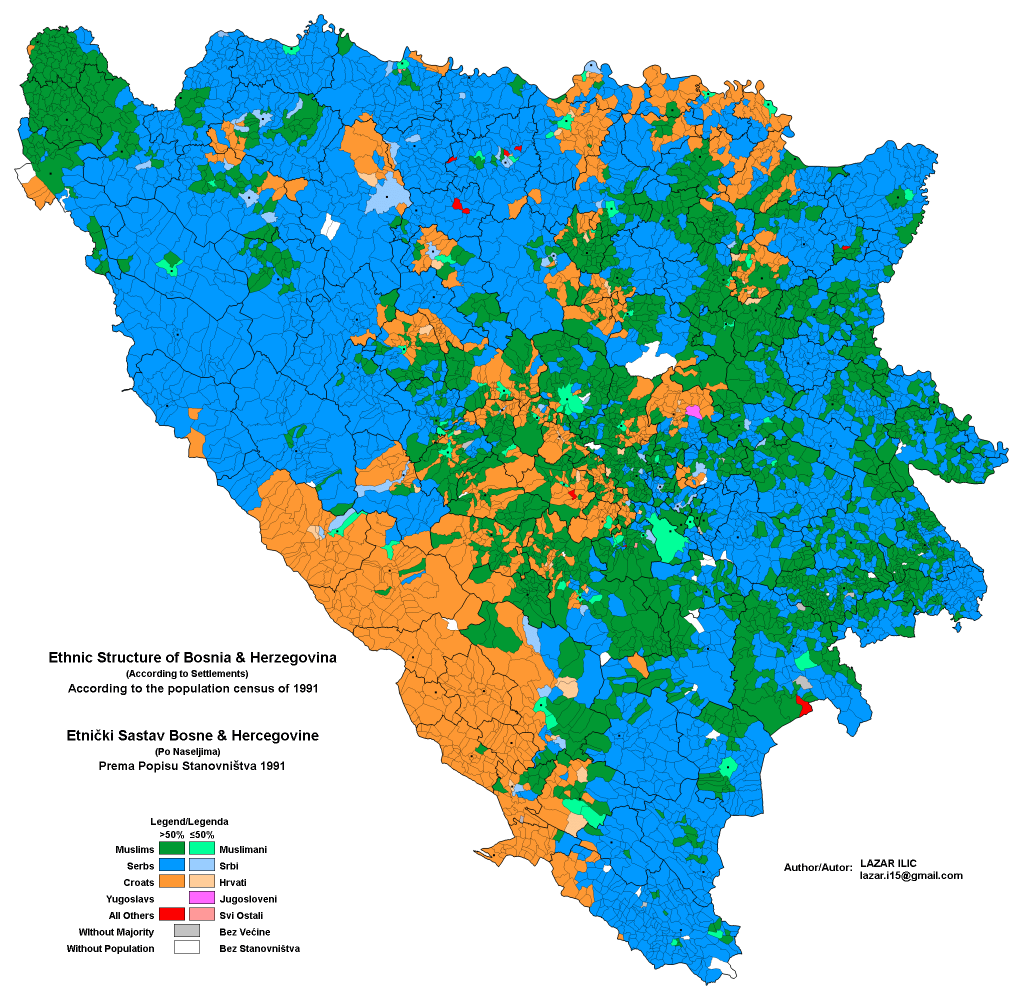
Ethnic map of Bosnia and Herzegovina in 1991 Bosniaks Serbs Croats

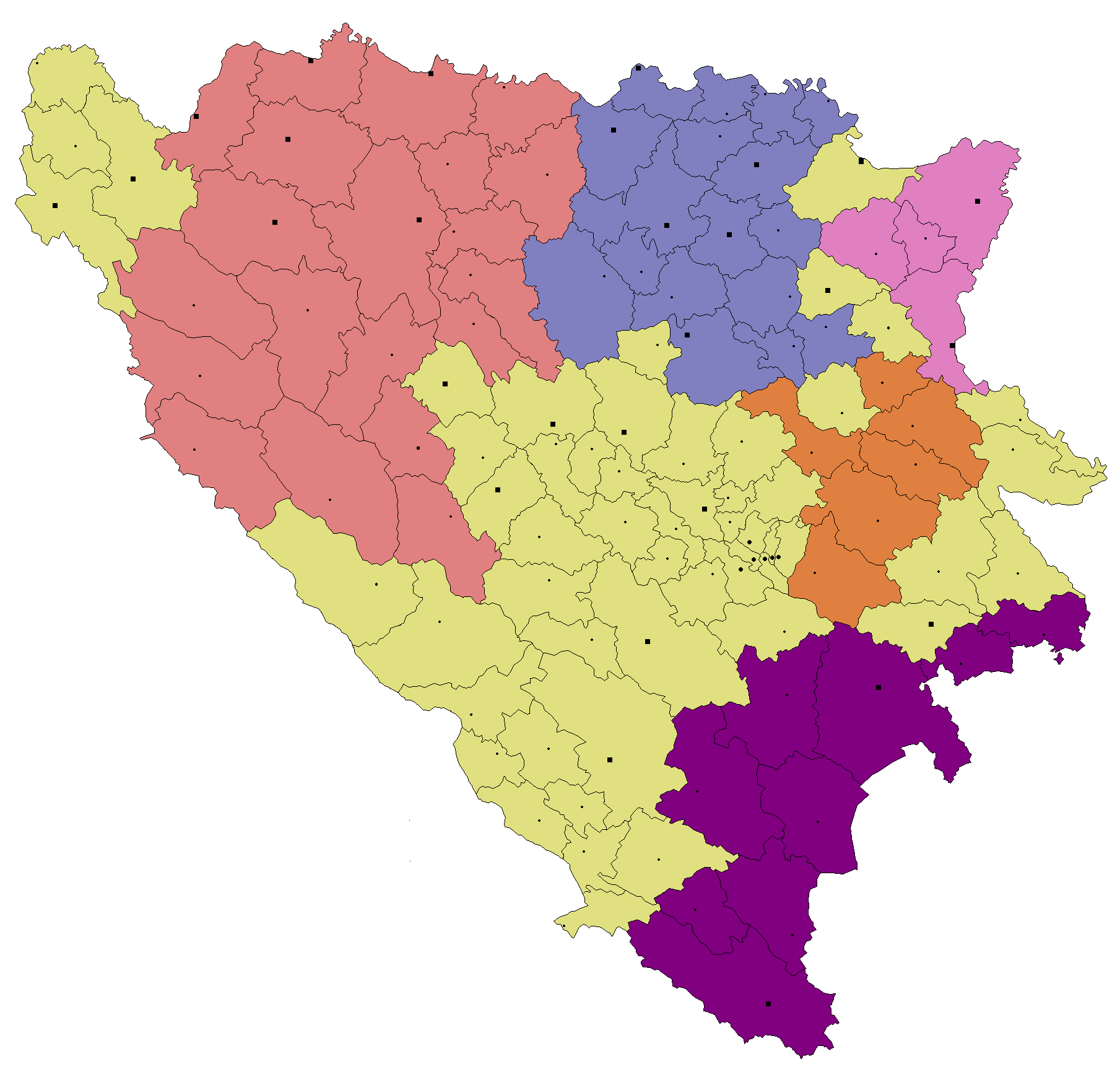
Serbian Autonomous Oblasts in November 1991

Meetings were held in early 1991 between the leaders of the six Yugoslav republics, and the two autonomous regions, to discuss the crisis. The Serbian leadership favoured a federal solution, whereas the Croatian and Slovenian leadership favoured an alliance of sovereign states. Bosnian leader Alija Izetbegović proposed an asymmetrical federation in February, where Slovenia and Croatia would maintain loose ties with the four remaining republics. Shortly after, he changed his position and opted for a sovereign Bosnia as a prerequisite for such a federation.

On 25 March, Franjo Tuđman and Serbian President Slobodan Milošević held a meeting in Karađorđevo. The meeting was controversial due to claims by some Yugoslav politicians the two presidents agreed to the partition of Bosnia and Herzegovina. On 6 June, Izetbegović and Macedonian president Kiro Gligorov proposed a weak confederation between Croatia, Slovenia, and a federation of the other four republics. That was rejected by the Milošević administration.

On 25 June 1991, Slovenia and Croatia declared independence. An armed conflict in Slovenia ensued, while clashes in areas of Croatia with substantial ethnic Serb populations escalated into a full-scale war. The Yugoslav People's Army (JNA) abandoned efforts to reassert control over Slovenia in July, while fighting in Croatia intensified until a ceasefire was agreed in January 1992. The JNA also attacked Croatia from Bosnia and Herzegovina.

In July 1991, representatives of the Serb Democratic Party (SDS), including SDS president Radovan Karadžić, Muhamed Filipović, and Adil Zulfikarpašić from the Muslim Bosniak Organisation (MBO), drafted an agreement known as the Zulfikarpašić–Karadžić agreement. This would leave SR Bosnia and Herzegovina in a state union with SR Serbia and SR Montenegro. The agreement was denounced by Croat political parties. Although initially welcoming the initiative, the Izetbegović administration later dismissed the agreement.

Between September and November 1991, the SDS organised the creation of six "Serb Autonomous Regions" (SAOs). This was in response to the Bosniaks' steps toward seceding from Yugoslavia. Similar steps were taken by the Bosnian Croats.

In August 1991, the European Economic Community hosted a conference in an attempt to prevent Bosnia and Herzegovina from sliding into war. On 25 September 1991, the United Nations Security Council passed Resolution 713, imposing an arms embargo on all former Yugoslav territories. The embargo had little effect on the JNA and Serb forces. Croatian forces had seized weaponry from the JNA during the Battle of the Barracks. The embargo had a significant impact in Bosnia and Herzegovina at the start of the Bosnian War. The Serb forces inherited the armaments and the equipment of the JNA, while the Croat and Bosniak forces obtained arms through Croatia in violation of the embargo.

On 19 September 1991, the JNA moved extra troops to the area around the city of Mostar. This was protested by the local government. On 20 September 1991, the JNA transferred troops to the front at Vukovar via the Višegrad region of northeastern Bosnia. In response, local Croats and Bosniaks set up barricades and machine-gun posts. They halted a column of 60 JNA tanks, but were dispersed by force the following day. More than 1,000 people had to flee the area. This action, nearly seven months before the start of the Bosnian War, caused the first casualties of the Yugoslav Wars in Bosnia. In the first days of October, the JNA attacked and leveled the Croat village of Ravno in eastern Herzegovina, on their way to attack Dubrovnik in southern Croatia.

On 6 October 1991, Bosnian president Alija Izetbegović gave a televised proclamation of neutrality, it included the statement "it is not our war". Izetbegović made a statement before the Bosnian parliament on 14 October with regard to the JNA: "Do not do anything against the Army. (...) the presence of the Army is a stabilizing factor to us, and we need that Army... Until now, we did not have problems with the Army, and we will not have problems later." Izetbegović had a testy exchange with Bosnian Serb leader Radovan Karadžić in parliament on that day. After Karadžić wagered that the Bosniak Muslims could not defend themselves if a state of war developed, Izetbegović observed that he found Karadžić's manner and speech offensive and it explained why the Bosniaks felt unwelcome, that his tone might explain why the others federated by Yugoslavia felt repelled, and that the threats of Karadžić were unworthy of the Serbian people.

Throughout 1990, the RAM Plan was developed by SDB and a group of selected Serb officers of the Yugoslav People's Army (JNA) with the purpose of organizing Serbs outside Serbia, consolidating control of the fledgling SDS parties and the positioning of arms and ammunition. The plan was meant to prepare the framework for a third Yugoslavia in which all Serbs with their territories would live together in the same state.

Journalist Giuseppe Zaccaria summarised a meeting of Serb army officers in Belgrade in 1992, reporting they had adopted an explicit policy to target women and children as the vulnerable portion of the Muslim social structure. According to some sources, the RAM plan was crafted in the 1980s. Its existence was leaked by Ante Marković, the Prime Minister of Yugoslavia, an ethnic Croat from Bosnia and Herzegovina. The existence and possible implementation of it alarmed the Bosnian government.

=== Final political crisis ===
On 15 October 1991, the parliament of the Socialist Republic of Bosnia and Herzegovina in Sarajevo passed a "Memorandum on the Sovereignty of Bosnia-Herzegovina" by a simple majority. The Memorandum was hotly contested by the Bosnian Serb members of parliament, arguing the Constitution required procedural safeguards and a two-thirds majority for such issues. The Memorandum was debated anyway, leading to a boycott of the parliament by the Bosnian Serbs, and the legislation was passed. The Serb political representatives proclaimed the Assembly of the Serb People of Bosnia and Herzegovina on 24 October 1991, declaring that the Serb people wished to remain in Yugoslavia. The Party of Democratic Action (SDA), led by Alija Izetbegović, was determined to pursue independence and was supported by Europe and the US The SDS made it clear that if independence was declared, Serbs would secede as it was their right to exercise self-determination.

The HDZ BiH was established as a branch of the ruling party in Croatia, the Croatian Democratic Union (HDZ). While it called for the independence of the country, there was a split in the party with some advocating secession of Croat-majority areas. In November 1991, the Croat leadership organised autonomous communities in areas with a Croat majority. On 12 November 1991, the Croatian Community of Bosnian Posavina was established in Bosanski Brod. It covered 8 municipalities in northern Bosnia. On 18 November 1991, the Croatian Community of Herzeg-Bosnia was established in Mostar. Mate Boban was chosen as its president. Its founding document said: "The Community will respect the democratically elected government of the Republic of Bosnia and Herzegovina for as long as exists the state independence of Bosnia and Herzegovina in relation to the former, or any other, Yugoslavia".

Borisav Jović's memoirs show that on 5 December 1991 Milošević ordered the JNA troops in BiH to be reorganised and its non-Bosnian personnel to be withdrawn, in case recognition would result in the perception of the JNA as a foreign force; Bosnian Serbs would remain to form the nucleus of a Bosnian Serb army. Accordingly, by the end of the month only 10–15% of the personnel in the JNA in BiH were from outside the republic. Silber and Little note that Milošević secretly ordered all Bosnian-born JNA soldiers to be transferred to BiH. Jović's memoirs suggest that Milošević planned for an attack on Bosnia well in advance.

On 9 January 1992, the Bosnian Serbs proclaimed the "Republic of the Serbian People in Bosnia-Herzegovina" (SR BiH, later Republika Srpska), but did not officially declare independence. The Arbitration Commission of the Peace Conference on Yugoslavia in its 11 January 1992 Opinion No. 4 on Bosnia and Herzegovina stated that the independence of Bosnia and Herzegovina should not be recognised because the country had not yet held a referendum on independence.

On 25 January 1992, an hour after the session of parliament was adjourned, the parliament called for a referendum on independence on 29 February and 1 March. The debate had ended after Serb deputies withdrew after the majority Bosniak–Croat delegates turned down a motion that the referendum question be placed before the not yet established Council of National Equality. The referendum proposal was adopted in the form as proposed by Muslim deputies, in the absence of SDS members. As Burg and Shoup note, "the decision placed the Bosnian government and the Serbs on a collision course". The upcoming referendum caused international concern in February.

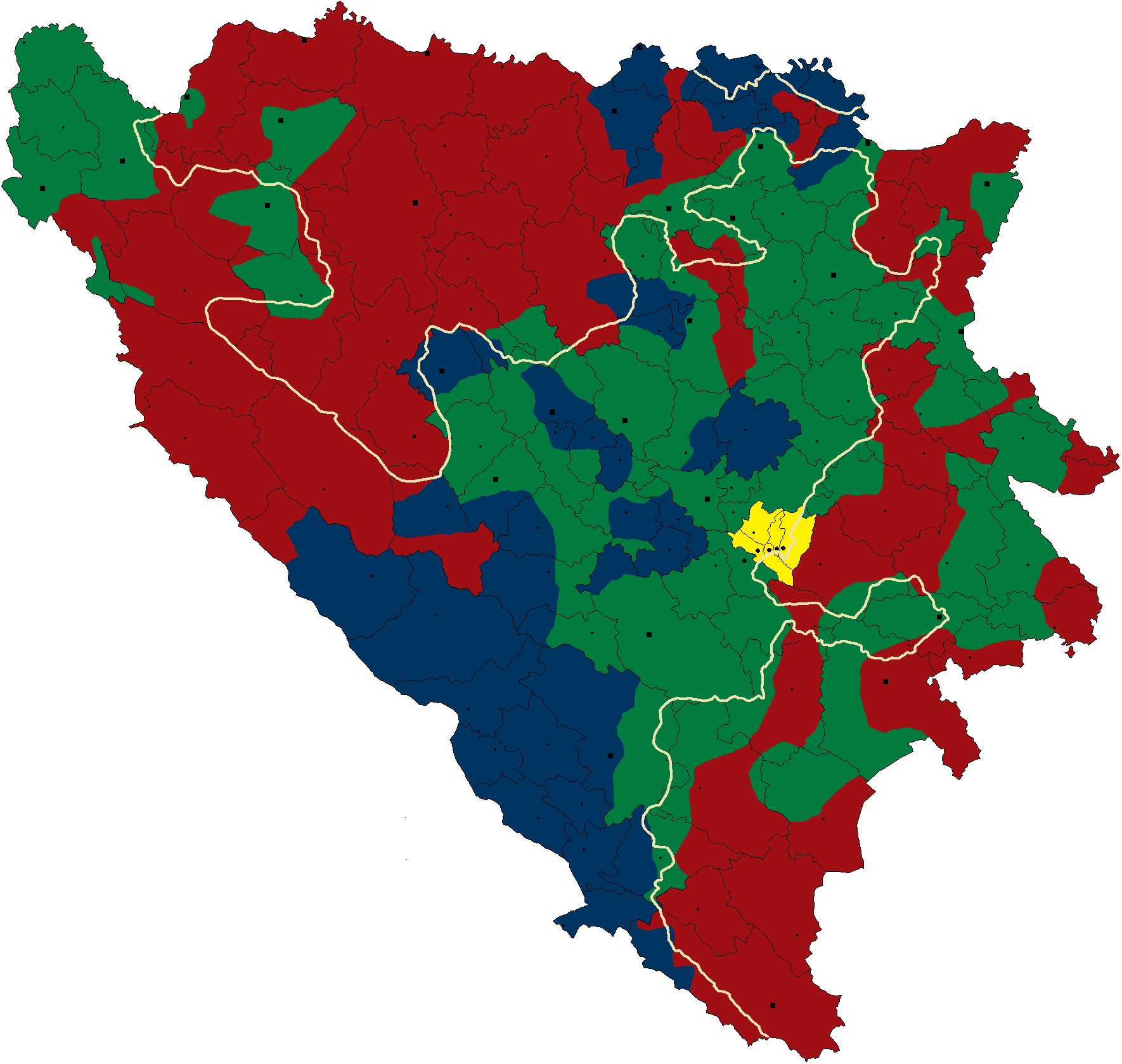
Carrington-Cutillero plan: Serbian cantons shown in red, Bosniak cantons in green, Croat cantons in blue

The Croatian War would result in United Nations Security Council Resolution 743 on 21 February 1992, which created the United Nations Protection Force (UNPROFOR). During talks in Lisbon on 21–22 February a peace plan was presented by EC mediator José Cutileiro, which proposed the independent state of Bosnia to be divided into three constituent units. Agreement was denounced by the Bosniak leadership on 25 February. On 28 February 1992, the Constitution of the SR BiH declared that the territory of that Republic included "the territories of the Serbian Autonomous Regions and Districts and of other Serbian ethnic entities in Bosnia and Herzegovina, including the regions in which the Serbian people remained in the minority due to the genocide conducted against it in World War II", and it was declared to be a part of Yugoslavia.

The Bosnian Serb assembly members advised Serbs to boycott the referendums held on 29 February and 1 March 1992. The turnout to the referendums was reported as 64%, with 93% of voters voting in favour of independence (implying that Bosnian Serbs, which made up approximately 34% of the population, largely boycotted the referendum). The Serb political leadership used the referendums as a pretext to set up roadblocks in protest. Independence was formally declared by the Bosnian parliament on 3 March 1992.

=== March 1992 unrest ===
During the referendum on 1 March, Sarajevo was quiet except for a Serbian wedding being fired upon. The brandishing of Serbian flags in the Baščaršija was seen by Muslims as a deliberate provocation on the day of the referendum. Nikola Gardović, the bridegroom's father, was killed, and a Serbian Orthodox priest was wounded. Witnesses identified the killer as Ramiz Delalić, a gangster who had become a brazen criminal since the fall of communism and was stated to have been a member of the Bosniak paramilitary group the "Green Berets". Arrest warrants were issued against him and another suspected assailant. SDS denounced the killing and claimed the failure to arrest him was due to SDA or Bosnian government complicity. A SDS spokesman stated it was evidence that Serbs were in mortal danger and would be further so in an independent Bosnia, which was rejected by Sefer Halilović, founder of the Patriotic League, who stated it was not a wedding but a provocation and accused the wedding guests of being SDS activists. Barricades appeared the following morning at key transit points across the city and were manned by armed and masked SDS supporters.

Following Bosnia and Herzegovina's declaration of independence from Yugoslavia on 3 March 1992, sporadic fighting broke out between Serbs and government forces all across the territory. On 18 March 1992, all three sides signed the Lisbon Agreement: Alija Izetbegović for the Bosniaks, Radovan Karadžić for the Serbs and Mate Boban for the Croats. However, on 28 March 1992, Izetbegović, after meeting with the US ambassador to Yugoslavia Warren Zimmermann in Sarajevo, withdrew his signature and declared his opposition to any type of ethnic division of Bosnia. What was said and by whom remains unclear. Zimmerman denies that he told Izetbegovic that if he withdrew his signature, the United States would grant recognition to Bosnia as an independent state. What is indisputable is that Izetbegovic, that same day, withdrew his signature and renounced the agreement.

In late March 1992, there was fighting between Serbs and combined Croat and Bosniak forces in and near Bosanski Brod, resulting in the killing of Serbs in Sijekovac. Serb paramilitaries committed the Bijeljina massacre, most of the victims were Bosniaks, on 1–2 April 1992.

== Course of the war ==
=== 1992 ===
Following Bosnia and Herzegovina's declaration of independence (which gained international recognition) and following the withdrawal of Alija Izetbegović from the previously signed Cutileiro Plan (which proposed a division of Bosnia into ethnic cantons), the Bosnian Serbs, led by Radovan Karadžić and supported by the government of Slobodan Milošević and the Yugoslav People's Army (JNA), mobilised their forces inside Bosnia and Herzegovina in order to secure ethnic Serb territory.

The first significant battle broke out in Bijeljina on 31 March between Bosniaks and Serbs. And that lasted until 3 April, when Arkan and his tigers destroyed the rebel Bosnian soldiers and committed a massacre on civilians. The war soon spread across the country, accompanied by ethnic cleansing. The war in Bosnia escalated in April. On 3 April, the Battle of Kupres began between the JNA and a combined HV-HVO force that ended in a JNA victory. On 6 April, Serb forces began shelling Sarajevo, and in the next two days crossed the Drina from Serbia proper and besieged Muslim-majority Zvornik, Višegrad and Foča. On 15 April JNA took full control of Višegrad in Operation Višegrad. On 17 April JNA took full control of Foča. After the capture of Zvornik, Bosnian Serb troops killed several hundred Muslims and forced tens of thousands to flee. All of Bosnia was engulfed in war by mid-April.

On 23 April, the JNA evacuated its personnel by helicopter from the barracks in Čapljina, which had been blockaded since 4 March. There were efforts to halt violence. On 27 April, the Bosnian government ordered the JNA to be put under civilian control or expelled, which was followed by conflicts in early May between the two. On 22 April Bosniaks and Croats attacked Ilidža but that attack failed. Prijedor was taken over by Serbs on 30 April. On 2 May, the Green Berets and local gang members fought back a disorganised Serb attack aimed at cutting Sarajevo in two. On 3 May, Izetbegović was kidnapped at the Sarajevo airport by JNA officers, and used to gain safe passage of JNA troops from downtown Sarajevo. However, Bosnian forces attacked the departing JNA convoy, which embittered all sides. ARBiH and HVO attacked Ilidza again on May 14, but that attack failed and the JNA destroyed them. On 15 May there was column incident in Tuzla. What started off as a peaceful retreat by agreement with local authorities ended in an ambush, when Patriotic League, Green Berets and Bosniaks from local police attacked the column. A ceasefire and agreement on evacuation of the JNA was signed on 18 May, and on 20 May the Bosnian presidency declared the JNA an occupation force.

== Aftermath ==
The Army of Republika Srpska was newly established and put under the command of General Ratko Mladić, in a new phase of the war. The JNA campaign in April and May paid off as very useful for the VRS side. After the Yugoslav People's Army left Bosnia, they played a role in military aid. Only Serb Volunteer Guard and other Serb volunteer groups from Serbia stayed in Bosnia having clashes with Bosniaks in Hrasnica near Sarajevo and other big operations made by Army of Republika Srpska.

== Sources ==
- Bethlehem, Daniel; Weller, Marc (1997). The Yugoslav Crisis in International Law. Cambridge University Press. ISBN 9780521463041.
- Bose, Sumantra (2009). Contested Lands. Harvard University Press. ISBN 978-0-674-02856-2.
- Burg, Steven L.; Shoup, Paul S. (1999). The War in Bosnia-Herzegovina: Ethnic Conflict and International Intervention (2nd ed.). M.E. Sharpe. ISBN 978-0-7656-3189-3.
- Caspersen, Nina (2010). Contested Nationalism: Serb Elite Rivalry in Croatia and Bosnia in the 1990s. Berghahn Books. ISBN 978-1-84545-791-4.
- Central Intelligence Agency, Office of Russian and European Analysis (2002). Balkan Battlegrounds: A Military History of the Yugoslav Conflict, 1990–1995, Volume 1. Washington, D.C.: Central Intelligence Agency. ISBN 978-0-16-066472-4.
- Central Intelligence Agency, Office of Russian and European Analysis (2002). Balkan Battlegrounds: A Military History of the Yugoslav Conflict, 1990–1995, Volume 2. Washington, D.C.: Central Intelligence Agency. ISBN 978-0-16-066472-4.
- Lučić, Ivo (June 2008). "Bosna i Hercegovina od prvih izbora do međunarodnog priznanja" [Bosnia and Herzegovina from the first elections to international recognition]. Review of Contemporary History. 40 (1). Zagreb, Croatia: Croatian Institute of History: 107–140.
- Lukic, Reneo; Lynch, Allen (1996). Europe from the Balkans to the Urals: The Disintegration of Yugoslavia and the Soviet Union. SIPRI, Oxford University Press. ISBN 9780198292005.
- Ramet, Sabrina P. (2006). The Three Yugoslavias: State-Building and Legitimation, 1918–2005. Bloomington, Indiana: Indiana University Press. ISBN 978-0-253-34656-8.
- Sadkovich, James J. (January 2007). "Franjo Tuđman and the Muslim-Croat War of 1993". Review of Croatian History. 2 (1): 204–245. ISSN 1845-4380.
- Schindler, John R. (2007). Unholy Terror: Bosnia, Al-Qa'ida, and the Rise of Global Jihad. New York City: Zenith Press. ISBN 9780760330036.
- Shrader, Charles R. (2003). The Muslim-Croat Civil War in Central Bosnia: A Military History, 1992–1994. College Station, Texas: Texas A&M University Press. ISBN 978-1-58544-261-4.
- Tanner, Marcus (2001). Croatia: A Nation Forged in War. New Haven: Yale University Press. ISBN 978-0-300-09125-0.
- Trbovich, Ana S. (2008). A Legal Geography of Yugoslavia's Disintegration. Oxford University Press, USA. ISBN 978-0-19-533343-5.
