= Bosnian Muslim paramilitary units =

Bosnian Muslim paramilitary units, that is militias or paramilitary units made up of Bosnian Muslims (Bosniaks) in war.

== World War II ==
During World War II, Bosnian Muslims established numerous self-defense units. Organizers of individual groups were Muhamed Hadžiefendić, Avdaga Hasić, Hasan Gondžić, Nešad Topčić, Džemal Tanović, Omer Čengić, Avdo Ferizbegović, Ismet Bektašević, Edhem Efendić, Zulfo Dumanjić, and Ibrahim Pjanić. These units are commonly known as Muslim militias, Bosnian: muslimanske milicije. Hoare describes them as "Muslim quisling armed formations". Most militias supported the Independent State of Croatia (NDH), a fascist puppet state of Nazi Germany governed by the Ustaše. These were mostly put under the command of the Croatian Home Guard (HD).

- Green cadres, independent units based in Sarajevo, Foča, Tuzla, Bihać, active December 1941–1943, 8,000 members, led by Nešad Topčić.
- Hadžiefendić Legion, HD unit based in Tuzla, active December 1941–May 1943, 5,000–6,000 members, led by Muhamed Hadžiefendić
- Huska's militia, an independent unit based in Bosanska Krajina, active October 1943–May 1944, 3,000 members, led by Husein Miljković
- Rogatica Muslim militia, led by Zulfo Dumanjić.
- Sokolac Muslim militia, led by Ibrahim Pjanić. After Tuzla's fall in 1943, Pjanić established a "Green cadre".
- Srebrenica or Bratunac Muslim militia, led by Edhem Efendić.
- Zvornik Muslim militia, led by Ismet Bektašević.

== Bosnian War ==
During the Bosnian War, Bosniak paramilitary forces supported an independent Bosnia and Herzegovina and either had a patriotic/nationalistic or islamist ideological undertone.

- Patriotic League (Bosnian: Patriotska liga), was established by Sefer Halilović in June 1991 in preparations for the coming Bosnian War. Together with Territorial Defence Force of the Republic of Bosnia and Herzegovina, it was transformed into the Army of the Republic of Bosnia and Herzegovina.
- Green Berets (Bosnian: Zelene beretke), created in Sarajevo in early 1991, was made up of demobilized Yugoslav People's Army (JNA) soldiers and conscripts who were mostly ethnic Bosniaks and Bosnian nationalists. Closely tied with SDA.
- Handschar Division (Bosnian: Handžar divizija), In imitation of Himmler, who on December 6, 1942 proposed to Hitler the formation of a division made up of Bosniak muslims, naming it the 13th SS "Handscar division", Gojko Šušak with approval from president Tudjman in 1991 formed a unit composed mainly of Bosnian but also minor Albanian muslim volunteers. This paramilitary would see battle in both the Croatian and Bosnian theater of war.
- Muslim Defence Forces (Bosnian: Muslimanske obrambene snage), also known as simply "muslim forces" were founded early 1992 in the areas of Zenica, Kakanj, Vareš, Žepča, Busovača, Travnik, Novi Travnik, Vitez, Visoko, Bugojno and Gornji Vakuf/Uskoplje from armed volunteers & patriots that had a more pious religious position. Soldiers from this organization would reorganize into the 7th muslim brigade and other units that have a "muslim" prefix after the creation of the legal and formal Bosnian army.
- Detachment "El - Mujahideen" (Bosnian: "Odred el - mudžahedin"), Created by foreign muslim volunteers who fought on the Bosnian muslim side during the war. They first arrived in central Bosnia in the latter half of 1992 with the aim of helping their Bosnian muslim co-religionists in fights against Serb and Croat forces. Initially they mainly came from Arab countries, later from other muslim-majority countries. The unit was de facto attached, recognized and supplied by the regular Bosnian army, even though they more than often operated independently as a volunteer paramilitary unit.

== See also ==
- Army of the Republic of Bosnia and Herzegovina
- Bosnian-Herzegovinian Infantry
- List of Serbian paramilitary formations

== Sources ==
Books

- Hoare, Marko Attila (2014). Bosnian Muslims in the Second World War: A History. Oxford University Press. ISBN 978-0-19-932785-0.
- Papadopolos, Dušan (1974). AVNOJ i narodnooslobodilačka borba u Bosni i Hercegovini: 1942-1943 : materijali sa naučnog skupa održanog u Sarajevu 22. i 23. novembra 1973. godine. Rad.
- Schindler, John R. (2007). Unholy Terror: Bosnia, Al-Qa'ida, and the Rise of Global Jihad. New York City: Zenith Press. ISBN 9780760330036.
- Tepić, Ibrahim (1998). Bosna i Hercegovina od najstarijih vremena do kraja Drugog svjetskog rata. Bosanski kulturni centar. p. 356. ISBN 9789958700002.

Journals

- IZ u BiH (2006). Glasnik Rijaseta Islamske zajednice u Bosni i Hercegovini. Vol. 68. Islamska zajednica u Bosni i Hercegovini. p. 1121.
- IZ u BiH (2007). Glasnik Rijaseta Islamske zajednice u Bosni i Hercegovini. Vol. 69. Islamska zajednica u Bosni i Hercegovini.
