= 1992 Yugoslav People's Army column incident in Tuzla =

1992 battle in Tuzla, Bosnia and Herzegovina

- Part of the Bosnian War
Date	~7:00 PM, 15 May, 1992
Location	Tuzla, Republic of Bosnia and Herzegovina
Result	Bosnian victory: JNA Column largely destroyed; large number of vehicles and ammunition destroyed due to fire

Belligerents
Bosnia and Herzegovina	FR Yugoslavia

Commanders and leaders
Ilija Jurišić	Mile Dubajić

Units involved
Bosnian Army; Tuzla Brigade	JNA; 92nd Motorised Brigade

Strength
~3,000 soldiers	~215–600 soldiers

Casualties and losses
Unknown	54 killed 44 wounded

The 1992 Yugoslav People's Army column incident in Tuzla, also known as Tuzla column (Serbo-Croatian: Tuzlanska kolona, Тузланска колона) was an attack on the 92nd Motorized Brigade of the Yugoslav People's Army (JNA) in the Bosnian city of Tuzla on 15 May 1992. The incident occurred at the road junction of Brčanska Malta. At least 54 soldiers of the JNA were killed and 44 wounded during the attacks.

== Background ==
When the Bosnian War broke out in April 1992, there were four types of federal and Serb armed forces in Bosnia and Herzegovina. These were; the Yugoslav people's Army (JNA), volunteer units raised by the JNA, Bosnian Serb Territorial Defense (TO) detachments, and Bosnian Serb Ministry of Internal Affairs Police (MUP). With the withdrawal of the JNA from Slovenia and much of Croatia, by early April 1992 the JNA in western Croatia and Bosnia and Herzegovina had around 100,000–110,000 troops, equipped with about 500 tanks, 400 medium artillery pieces, 48 multiple rocket launchers, and 350 120 mm mortars. In addition, the JNA had 120 fighter-bombers, 40 light helicopters and 30 transport helicopters. The Bosnian Serb MUP totalled about 15,000, including active, special and reserve police. From March 1991, the leaders of Bosniak-based Party of Democratic Action (SDA) had been developing an armed force called the "Patriotic League of People's" or Patriotic League, and despite an arms embargo, weapons began to be issued in August 1991. By April 1992, the Patriotic League numbered around 40,000 troops, in nine regional commands, one of which was reportedly headquartered in Tuzla.

When the war broke out, the Bosnia and Herzegovina TO was mobilised, but the JNA refused to return its weaponry, which it had confiscated in 1990. Bosniaks and Bosnian Croats had already left the JNA. The priority for the JNA was the security of its bases, as this had proven to be a vulnerability during the Battle of the Barracks in Croatian War of Independence. At the beginning of April, a number of towns in north-eastern Bosnia fell in quick succession to a combination of JNA, Serb volunteer and Bosnian Serb forces. These included Bijeljina, Zvornik, Višegrad, and Foča. On 15 April, Bosnian MUP and TO seized the arms, ammunition and equipment of the Tuzla Regional TO in the towns of Srebrenik, Lukavac and in Tuzla itself. By the end of the month, the Bosnian Government had re-organised the Bosnia and Herzegovina TO, incorporating the troops of the Patriotic League. In total, the new force had around 100,000 men, but only about 40,000–50,000 small arms and virtually no heavy weapons.

== Attack ==
On May 15, 1992, Yugoslav People’s Army forces in Tuzla were pulling out of their barracks in Husinsko Brdo and heading towards Bijeljina, which was under Serb control since late 1991. There was an exchange of fire with local Territorial Defence and police forces at the Brcanska Malta crossroads.

After an earlier unsuccessful attempt to leave the barracks, the JNA convoy departed again at 19:00 along the agreed withdrawal route towards Simin Han and Požarnica. During the 2011 retrial of Ilija Jurišić before the War Crimes Chamber of the Higher Court in Belgrade, Lieutenant Colonel Mile Dubajić, the former commander of the JNA's Husinska Buna barracks in Tuzla, reiterated his earlier testimony in the initial trial concerning the convoy's departure. He testified that a civilian police vehicle driven by Muhamed Brkić led the column, while Lieutenant Colonel Mile Dubajić and Territorial Defence commander Enver Delibegović followed in an armoured vehicle. Approximately 15 minutes after departure, upon reaching Simin Han, Dubajić ordered a halt to check the progress of the remaining vehicles. He subsequently heard gunfire and learned that the convoy had come under attack. Meho Bajrić, head of the Tuzla Public Security Centre, denied that he had reached an agreement with Dubajić for the evacuation of the barracks and that Ilija Jurišić merely relayed his instruction over the radio to return fire after receiving reports from police commanders in the field that JNA soldiers were shooting.

The Serbian side alleges that it was a repeat of a similar incident that occurred in Sarajevo a week prior where a JNA column was ambushed.

According to an indictment issued by the Office of the War Crimes Prosecutor of the Republic of Serbia in the District Court of Belgrade War Crimes Chamber on 9 November 2007, at least 92 members of the JNA were killed in the attack on the convoy, a further 33 were wounded, and a number of military vehicles, including ambulances, were also destroyed. The names of those killed and wounded in the attack were listed in the indictment. Those involved were the Territorial Defence, Patriotic League, the Tuzla Public Security Service, police and snipers.

== Later developments ==
Years later, the Serbian War Crimes Prosecutor's Office indicted former head of Tuzla public security, an ethnic Croat Ilija Jurišić, on suspicion that he committed a war crime by allegedly ordering the attack. The case was dismissed before Bosnian courts. He was arrested at the Belgrade Airport in May 2007 and was found guilty of improper battlefield conduct in 2009 and sentenced to 12 years in prison. In October 2010, an appeals court later overturned the sentence. The Belgrade Appeals Court ordered a re-trial and released him from detention. Tuzla citizens have continued to express their support for Ilija Jurišić. Subsequently, Jurišić was welcomed by a large crowd upon his return to Tuzla on 11 October 2010 after his sentence was overturned. The re-trial was held and he was sentenced again to 12 years in prison. On 2 April 2015, an appeal commenced against the result of the re-trial. In March 2016, his conviction was again overturned.

The city of Tuzla celebrates 15 May as "City Liberation Day".

== See also ==
- 25 May 1995 Tuzla shelling
- 1992 Yugoslav People's Army column incident in Sarajevo

== Sources ==
- Balkan Battlegrounds: A Military History of the Yugoslav Conflict. Central Intelligence Agency, Office of Russian and European Analysis. 2002.
- "Indictment Office of the War Crimes Prosecutor v. Ilija Jurišić" (PDF). International Crimes Database. 9 November 2007.
- "Office of the War Crimes Prosecutor v. Ilija Jurišić". International Crimes Database.
- Ostojic, Mladen (2014). Between Justice and Stability: The Politics of War Crimes Prosecutions in Post-Milošević Serbia. Ashgate Publishing, Ltd. ISBN 978-1-4094-6742-7.
