= Seve =

Seve or Sève may refer to:

== Surname ==
- Alfred De Sève (1858–1927), Canadian violinist, composer and music educator
- Antônio Caetano Sève Navarro (1841–1898), Brazilian jurist
- Jacques de Sève (fl. 1742–1788), French illustrator
- Lucien Sève (1926–2020), French philosopher
- Peter de Sève (born 1958), American illustrator and animation character designer

== Given name ==
- Seve Ballesteros (1957–2011), Spanish golfer
- Seve Benson (born 1986), English golfer
- Seve Paeniu (born 1965), Tuvaluan diplomat

== Other uses ==
- Ševe, a secret police organization in Bosnia and Herzegovina
- "Seve", a song by Tez Cadey
- Seve Dam, Turkey
- Seve Trophy, a European golf tournament, named after the Spanish golfer
