= Milutin Kukanjac =

Yugoslav military officer (1935-2002)

- Born: 1 January 1935; Ljubiš, Drina Banovina, Kingdom of Yugoslavia
- Died: 16 January 2002 (aged 67); Belgrade, Serbia, FR Yugoslavia
- Military career
- Allegiance: SFR Yugoslavia; FR Yugoslavia
- Branch: Yugoslav People's Army; Armed Forces of Yugoslavia
- Service years: Until 1992
- Rank: Colonel general
- Commands: 2nd VO
- Conflicts: Bosnian War; 1992 Yugoslav campaign in Bosnia; Operation Višegrad; Siege of Sarajevo; 1992 JNA column ambush

Milutin Kukanjac (Serbian Cyrillic: Милутин Кукањац; 1 January 1935 – 16 January 2002) was a Yugoslav military officer who was a colonel general with the Yugoslav People's Army (JNA) at the beginning of the Bosnian War.

== Career ==
Kukanjac was commander of the Siege of Sarajevo from March until July 1992. Kukanjac and the Yugoslav People's Army left Sarajevo at this time.

On 3 May 1992, Kukanjac commanded the Yugoslav People's Army (JNA) units on Dobrovoljačka Street in Sarajevo, when JNA withdrawal column came under unexpected attack. Five JNA officers and one civilian were killed, and some weapons were seized. The figure of 42 JNA soldiers cited in propaganda is disinformation intended to fuel further animosity. The incident was chaotic and unplanned, not a coordinated ambush.

He was also responsible for ordering a demolition of the Armijska Ratna Komanda D-0 nuclear bunker on 7 May 1992, but the plan was sabotaged.

He appeared in the BBC documentary series The Death of Yugoslavia.
