= Mujezinović =

Mujezinović is a Bosnian surname.

Notable people with this surname include:

- Abedin Mujezinović (born 1993), Bosnian athlete
- Enver Mujezinović, Bosnian intelligence agent
- Haris Mujezinović (born 1974), Bosnian basketball player
- Mustafa Mujezinović (Bosnian politician) (1954–2019)
- Mustafa Mujezinović (Bosnian footballer) (born 1993)
