= Ševe =

Secret police of Bosnia and Herzegovina

- Ševe

Agency overview
- Formed: May 1992
- Dissolved: 1996 (de facto); 2002 (formally disbanded with AID)
- Type: Special anti-terrorist unit / Secret police
- Jurisdiction: Republic of Bosnia and Herzegovina
- Headquarters: Sarajevo
- Employees: Estimated 20–30 core members
- Minister responsible: Alija Delimustafić, Minister of Interior (Founder)
- Agency executive: Nedžad Ugljen, Operational Commander
- Parent department: Ministry of Interior of the Republic of Bosnia and Herzegovina (MUP RBiH); Agency for Investigation and Documentation (AID)

Ševe ("The Larks") was a special anti-terrorist unit of the Ministry of Interior of the Republic of Bosnia and Herzegovina (MUP RBiH), active during the Bosnian War (1992–1995) and the immediate post-war period. Founded in May 1992, the unit was officially tasked with special operations against enemy forces, particularly snipers. However, the unit has been the subject of significant controversy and multiple judicial investigations due to allegations of political assassinations, torture, and acting as a "state within a state" for the ruling political elite. According to Edin Garaplija, an agent of the secret service AID who was tasked with investigating the ‘Ševe’ unit, Ševe was a secret terrorist unit, financed from "black funds", whose task was to commit the gravest crimes and terrorist attacks in order to fuel the war and hatred among the peoples. In addition, it was specialized in the assassination of interval rivals within the ranks of the ARBIH.

== History and Formation ==
The unit was established in May 1992, shortly after the start of the Siege of Sarajevo. Its founder was the then-Minister of Interior, Alija Delimustafić. The operational command was held by Nedžad Ugljen, a high-ranking official of the State Security Service (SDB) and later the deputy director of the Agency for Investigation and Documentation (AID).

According to testimonies given before the International Criminal Tribunal for the former Yugoslavia (ICTY), the unit recruited former members of the Yugoslav Counter-Intelligence Service (KOS), special forces from Niš, and individuals with sniper skills. One of the key operatives identified in court documents was Nedžad Herenda.

== Organizational Structure ==
Although formally part of the MUP RBiH, investigations and testimonies suggest that "Ševe" operated outside the regular chain of command of the Army of the Republic of Bosnia and Herzegovina (ARBiH) and the regular police.

Witnesses at the ICTY described a parallel chain of command that linked the unit directly to the political leadership. According to the testimony of a witness identified as KW-586 (a member of the "Biseri" unit responsible for presidential security), key figures aware of the unit's activities allegedly included Bakir Alispahić (Minister of Interior), Enver Mujezinović, and Fikret Muslimović (Head of Military Security).

== Controversies and Alleged Crimes ==
The unit has been linked to several high-profile crimes and political assassinations aimed at internal rivals or destabilizing the situation in Sarajevo.

=== Attempted Assassination of Sefer Halilović (1993) ===
On 7 July 1993, an explosion occurred in the apartment of Sefer Halilović, the Chief of Staff of the ARBiH, killing his wife Mediha and her brother Edin Rondić. While official reports at the time attributed the explosion to a shell fired by the Army of Republika Srpska (VRS), Halilović and subsequent investigators have alleged that the device was planted by members of "Ševe" aimed at eliminating Halilović due to his conflict with the political leadership.

=== Assassination of Nedžad Ugljen (1996) ===
Nedžad Ugljen, the operational commander of "Ševe", was assassinated in Sarajevo on 28 September 1996. His murder remains officially unsolved. It is widely believed that he was killed to prevent him from testifying about the unit's wartime activities, effectively serving as a "sanitization" operation to protect higher-ranking officials. A few days before his own murder, Ramiz Delalić stated that Kemal Ademović, the director of AID, and Bakir Izetbegović had ordered the killing of Nedžad Ugljen. Even Ugljen himself, shortly before his death, accused Kemal Ademović of wanting to ‘silence’ him.

=== The "Herenda" Case ===
In 1996, Edin Garaplija, an agent of the secret service AID, was tasked with investigating the "Ševe" unit. During this operation, AID agents arrested Nedžad Herenda, a member of "Ševe", and interrogated him. During the interrogation, Herenda confessed to numerous crimes, including the murder of captured JNA soldiers, a French UNPROFOR soldier, Boško Brkić and Admira Ismić (also known as Sarajevo's Romeo and Juliet), and the attempted assassination of Sefer Halilović and Ismet Bajramović. He also confessed to randomly shooting civilians in the Sarajevo neighborhood of Grbavica. This interrogation led to a controversial trial against Garaplija himself for kidnapping and attempted murder, while Herenda reportedly fled Bosnia and Herzegovina.

=== Allegations regarding "False Flag" Operations ===
During trials at the ICTY, defense teams for Serb defendants (such as Radovan Karadžić and Ratko Mladić) attempted to attribute responsibility for certain attacks on civilians in Sarajevo (including the Markale massacres) to the "Ševe" unit, claiming they were "false flag" operations designed to provoke international intervention. However, the ICTY Trial Chambers, after reviewing all forensic and ballistic evidence, consistently rejected these claims and found that the shells were fired from VRS positions, establishing that the terror campaign against Sarajevo was conducted by Serb forces.

== Legal Proceedings ==
The existence and activities of "Ševe" have been the subject of proceedings in domestic courts in Bosnia and Herzegovina. In 2021, the Prosecutor's Office of BiH issued an indictment in the "Dobrovoljačka" case which included references to the activities of parapolice structures, and separate investigations were launched regarding the murder of Nedžad Ugljen. Former AID agent Edin Garaplija, who first exposed the unit's activities, was acquitted of charges related to his investigation in subsequent legal proceedings.

== See also ==
- Siege of Sarajevo
- Bosnian War
- Ministry of Interior of the Republic of Bosnia and Herzegovina
- Agency for Investigation and Documentation
