= Battle of Mojmilo Ridge =

1992 event of the Siege of Sarajevo

- Part of the Siege of Sarajevo
Date	8–11 June 1992
Location	Sarajevo, Bosnia and Herzegovina
Result	TOBiH victory: VRS was forced to retreat after heavy losses; TOBiH successfully repelled the attackers

Belligerents
Bosnia and Herzegovina	Republika Srpska

Commanders and leaders
Esad Pelko; Sefer Halilović	Unknown

Units involved
Territorial Defence of Bosnia and Herzegovina	Army of Republika Srpska

Strength
Unknown	500 troops, 2 transporters, 4 tanks

Casualties and losses
Unknown	All 4 tanks destroyed

The Battle of Mojmilo Ridge was an engagement during the Siege of Sarajevo in 1992, in which Bosnian government forces captured and held Mojmilo Ridge, southwest of the city, removing a sniper threat to Sarajevo's southwestern neighborhoods.

== Background ==
Sarajevo was besieged by Bosnian Serb forces and remnants of the Yugoslav People's Army (JNA) throughout 1992. Mojmilo Ridge was a critical position providing the Serb forces with a sniper advantage over southwestern parts of Sarajevo. The defense of the city relied on a combination of government police, local militias, support. Control of Mojmilo Hill was strategically significant, as it hindered enemy advancements toward key military installations such as the "Viktor Bubanj" and Nedžarići barracks. This defensive effort also thwarted attempts to encircle the Dobrinja area, contributing to the broader defense of the region.

The JNA attempted a major escalation against the city by sending two armored columns from garrisons outside Sarajevo on 2 May. One column advanced from the west near Sarajevo Airport but was halted by improvised government defenses in the Stup neighborhood. Another column moved north from the Lukavica barracks toward the government-controlled city center. Bosnian forces, repelled the advance using Molotov cocktails, rifle grenades, and a makeshift artillery piece. Four tanks were destroyed, and the remaining vehicles retreated south with no ground gained, marking a significant psychological victory for the defenders of Sarajevo.

== Battle ==
In June 1992, the government of the Republic of Bosnia and Herzegovina launched a coordinated operation to secure Mojmilo Ridge, a strategic high ground southwest of Sarajevo. The area had been used by Bosnian Serb forces to target the city with snipers and sporadic artillery fire. The ridge's capture was essential to reduce threats to the southwestern neighborhoods of Sarajevo.

Following these clashes, the Bosnian Government organized attacks to secure hilltop positions overlooking the city. Their efforts were met with resistance, but they successfully captured Mojmilo Ridge. While some gains were temporary due to counterattacks and artillery fire, retaining control of the ridge removed the sniper threat to key parts of the city, providing Sarajevo with a crucial defensive advantage during the ongoing siege.

== See also ==
- Battle of Žuč
