= German-Croatian Police =

- Deutsch-Kroatische Polizei; Hrvatsko-Njemačko Redarstvo
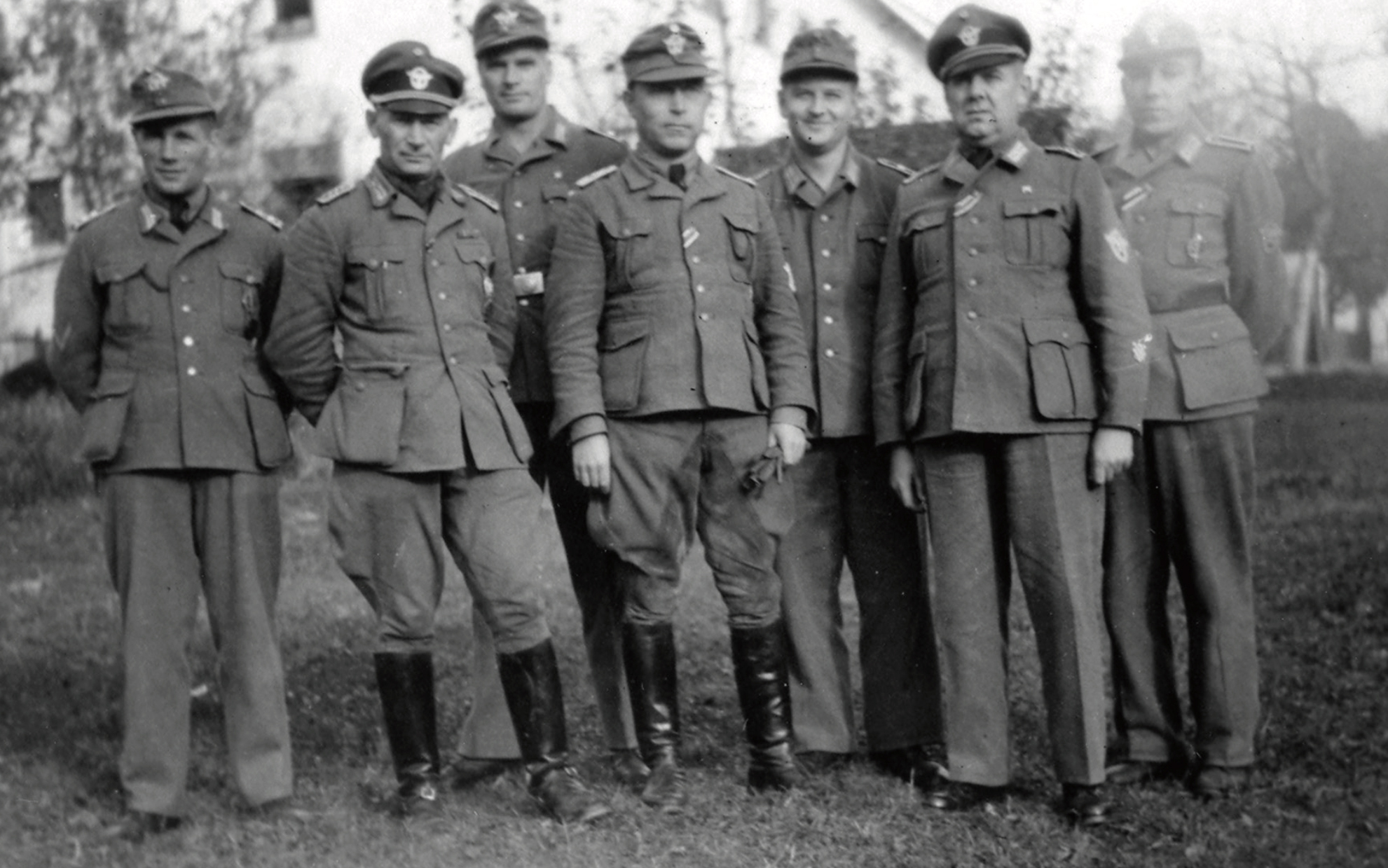
- Officers and men of the German-Croatian Police. c. 1944
- Active: 10 March 1943 – 1945
- Countries: Independent State of Croatia
- Allegiance: Nazi Germany; Independent State of Croatia
- Role: Auxiliary police
- Size: 32,000

Commanders
- Notable commanders: SS-Gruppenführer; Konstantin Kammerhofer

Insignia
- Shield patch (Note: The Croatian national shield was introduced in October 1944)

The German-Croatian Police (German: Deutsch-Kroatische Polizei; Croatian: Hrvatsko-Njemačko Redarstvo), also known as the German-Croatian SS Police and Gendarmerie, was a force established by the SS for internal security operations in the Independent State of Croatia. In all, 32,000 Croats served in the various units of this Police force, under German command, with the task of preserving order and help defend Axis strategic positions throughout the country.

== Background ==
Four days after the German Wehrmacht invaded the Kingdom of Yugoslavia, on 6 April 1941, the Croatian fascist Ustasha under Poglavnik Ante Pavelić proclaimed the Independent State of Croatia (NDH), with Axis support. On 17 April 1941, Yugoslavia surrendered to the Axis powers, that same month the NDH, resolved to create a “pure” Catholic Croatian state, established the first Ustasha concentration camps and introduced discriminatory laws against Serbs, Jews and Roma, mass arrests and deportations started a few days later under the supervision of the Ustasha militia.

== History ==
As the war progressed, the German armed forces started to complain increasingly about the Ustasha's slaughter of whole Serb communities and their failure to subdue Guerrilla forces. By February 1942, the German Foreign Ministry in Zagreb estimated that the Ustasha had murdered approximately three hundred thousand Serbs. The Wehrmacht came to the conclusion that the actions of the Ustashas were driving Serb peasants into insurgency, the SS also considered the completely uninhibited violent action by the Ustashas in Croatian territory to be increasingly counterproductive in view of the worsening war situation. (Note: Himmler himself commented that "It was a serious political mistake to think that two million Orthodox Slavs could be exterminated".)

In response at the beginning of 1943 the German authorities began to tighten their control over the Ustashas, it was decided that Croatian police sovereignty should only exist if it benefited German interests, this meant the transfer of police power, and part of the executive in Croatia to German departments.

== Formation and organization ==
On 10 March 1943, after an agreement was reached with the government of the NDH, regarding the interior security of the country, a German-Croatian Police force was established by Reichsführer-SS Himmler's representative in Croatia, Higher SS and Police Leader for Croatia (HSSPF) (Note: equivalent to SS-Gruppenführer und Generalleutnant der Polizei) SS-Brigadeführer and Generalmajor of Police Konstantin Kammerhofer. Until then no German police regiments operated in Croatia. The officers and cadres of the force were mostly Germans and Volksdeutsche (ethnic Germans) while the rest of the ranks were Croatian volunteers or conscripts. The men wore German SS uniforms with the Croatian national shield patch worn on the left forearm, they were required to take the Hitler Oath as well as swear allegiance to Croatian dictator Ante Pavelić.

Under the agreement Croatian police had to be available to the German authorities whenever they deemed it necessary, all branch of the Croatian administration had to provide information to Kammerhofer and assist his forces when required. In the event of new military operations in an area, the mixed SS police and gendarmerie units were immediately to come under the command of the German military commander.

By September 1943 seven battalions were formed, the initial composition of the force was:

- 1—5 Polizei Freiwilligen-Regimenter "Kroatien" (Police Volunteer regiments "Croatia") of 3 battalions each.
- 1—15 independent Polizei-Freiwilligen battalions "Kroatien" (Police Volunteer battalions "Croatia").

In September 1943, as a result of the power vacuum created by the capitulation of Italy, the Reich Security Main Office (RSHA) dispatched the newly established Einsatzgruppe E (a paramilitary death squad) of the SS Security Service, under SS-Obersturmbannfuhrer Gunther Hermann, to strengthen the Police presence in Croatia. As part of the Police force Einsatzgruppe E and its 1—5 battalion sized Einsatzkommandos, were able to confront the Yugoslav partisans with men hardened and trained in combat during the Eastern campaign. The Einsatzkommandos were deployed in the area of Vinkovci, Sarajevo, Banja Luka, Knin, and Zagreb, to fight against resistance movements. Einsatzgruppe E organised the deportation of the Jews who had found refuge in the coastal region of Dalmatia, the districts of Croatia formerly under Italian control, to the Auschwitz concentration camp.

In December 1944, a Polizei Panzer-Jäger Kompanie "Kroatien" (Police Anti-Tank Company "Croatia") was raised in Zagreb by the BdO Police Commander (Befehlshaber der Ordnungspolizei independently of the other units. Croats also manned the 16. SS-Polizei Panzer Kompanie (16th SS Police Armoured Company) which included armoured cars and light tanks. In Bosnia the Police force supervised a village militia called Ortswehr. At the end of 1944 the force represented a total of 32,000 men under German Police and SS command.

In early 1945, 12 of the Police Volunteer battalions were eventually combined into a Croatian Gendarmerie Division

== Commanders ==
- SS-Gruppenführer (Note: SS-Brigadeführer until 1 July 1943 then SS-Gruppenführer) and Generalleutnant of Police Konstantin Kammerhofer (13 March 1943 – 10 January 1945).
