= Uzdol massacre =

1993 mass killing during the Bosnian War

- Part of the Bosnian War
- Location: Uzdol, Bosnia and Herzegovina
- Date: 14 September 1993
- Target: Croats
- Attack type: Mass murder
- Deaths: 25-30
- Perpetrator: Army of the Republic of Bosnia and Herzegovina (ARBiH)

The Uzdol massacre refers to the murders of at least 29 ethnic Croat inhabitants of the village of Uzdol by members of the Army of the Republic of Bosnia and Herzegovina (ARBiH) on 14 September 1993, during Operation Neretva '93, part of the Croat-Bosniak War.

== Murders ==
The massacre took place during Operation Neretva '93, when ARBiH forces, under the command of Sefer Halilović, raided the Croat village of Uzdol on 14 September 1993, 70-100 Bosnian troops infiltrated past the Croat defense lines and reached the village. After capturing the command post of the Croatian Defence Council (HVO), Bosnian Muslim troops went on a killing spree against civilians.

The International Criminal Tribunal for the former Yugoslavia (ICTY) trial of Sefer Halilović determined beyond a reasonable doubt that at least 25 Croat civilians were killed during the massacre. Other sources state a higher death toll of up to 30 Croats killed; 29 civilians and one HVO prisoner. 12 HVO soldiers were also killed in combat during the attack on the village.

The victims were mostly shot in their homes at close range, three of the victims were children (the youngest only ten years of age), while the remaining civilians were mostly women and elderly.

== ICTY Trial ==
Sefer Halilović, Deputy Commander of the Headquarters of the Supreme Command of the Army of the Republic of Bosnia and Herzegovina and Chief of Staff of the Supreme Command of the Army of Bosnia and Herzegovina, as well as the leader of the inspection team for the command and coordination of the "Neretva-93" operation, was charged before the ICTY for the crimes in Uzdol and Grabovica. He was acquitted of murder as a violation of the laws and customs of war, because the prosecution did not prove beyond a reasonable doubt that Sefer Halilović had effective control over the units under the command of the Bosnian Army that the Trial Chamber found to have committed the crimes in Uzdol and Grabovica.

The prosecution appealed the verdict. On 16 October 2007 the appeals chamber ruled against the prosecution appeal and confirmed the acquittal verdict rendered almost two years earlier by the trial chamber.

== Verdicts ==
In 2019, the Bosnian State Court in Sarajevo sentenced Enver Buza, the former commander of the Independent Prozor Battalion of the ARBiH, to 12 years in prison for failing to protect civilians that were killed by forces under his command. The court found that Buza was adequately informed about the crime, which obliged him to conduct a thorough investigation, but that it was apparent from the evidence that this was not done, and that the intention was to cover up the crime.
