= Državna Tajna =

2005 book by Semir Halilović

- Državna Tajna: STROGO POVJERLJIVO.
- Author: Semir Halilović
- Original title: Bloody October
- Language: Bosnian
- Series: 1st book
- Genre: Non-fiction
- Publisher: MATICA
- Publication date: 2005
- Publication place: Bosnia and Herzegovina
- Media type: Print (Paperback)
- Pages: 302pp (first edition, paperback)
- ISBN: 9958-763-05-2
- OCLC: 71337797
- LC Class: DR1755 .H35 2005
- Preceded by: none
- Followed by: Državna Tajna 2:Vojska poražene ideje

Državna Tajna (English: State Secret) is a book by Semir Halilović, son of Bosnian general Sefer Halilović, published in 2005. The book has the tagline "STROGO POVJERLJIVO" (STRICTLY CONFIDENTIAL.) He published a follow-up book, Državna Tajna 2: Vojska poražene ideje (English: State Secret 2: The Army of a Beaten Idea) in 2007.

== About the book ==
The book described some of the events which shaped wartime Bosnia. It focuses primarily on wartime Sarajevo in 1993 and what happened within the Bosnian government and army. The book talks specifically about Operations "Trebević" I, II and III. Semir was in the Bosnian war in 1992–93 and he details the battle for the mountain Igman, the killing of Caco, the capture of Ćelo, the Fall of Srebrenica and Žepa, and the capture of Naser Orić.

=== Državna Tajna CD ===
The book comes with a CD on which there are a number of audio conversations taped, as mentioned above, and two videos. It also include all the Bosnian government state secret documents which is what the book is based on. There are also original war pictures from Semir's collection, and other pictures as well.

== Death threat ==
In April 2006, Semir Halilović was accosted and threatened with death by one of the people whom the book cast in a bad light, Ramiz Delalić, who was also a prosecution witness during his father's trial.

== Cover ==
The persons on the cover of the book from top to bottom, left to right are:

- Alija Izetbegović (President of Bosnia and Commander-in-chief of the Army of the Republic of Bosnia and Herzegovina)
- Mušan Topalović "Caco" (Commander of the 10th Mountain Brigade of the 1st Corps)
- Rasim Delić (Commander of the Army of the Republic of Bosnia and Herzegovina and the Main Staff/General Staff 1993–95)
- Ismet Bajramović "Ćelo"(Commander of Bosnian Military Police detachment in Sarajevo)
- Ejup Ganić (vice-president and member of the war Presidency of Bosnia and Herzegovina)
- Dr. Haris Silajdžić (Foreign Minister of Bosnia 1990–93, Prime Minister of Bosnia 1993-1996 and president of the government)
- Naser Orić (Commander of the 8th Operational Group in Srebrenica later renamed 28th Mountain Division of the 2nd Corps)
- Sefer Halilović (Commander of the Army of the Republic of Bosnia and Herzegovina and Chief of Staff of the Main Staff 1992–93; Deputy commander and still Chief of Staff of the Main Staff until November 1993)
- Jusuf Prazina "Juka" (Commander of Special Brigade ARBiH, Commander of the Special Forces of Bosnia, known as "Juka's Wolves" 1992–1993, commander of Special Forces of HOS 1993 until he escaped to Croatia)
- Bakir Alispahić (Minister of Bosnian Ministry of the Interior and director of Bosnian AID (secret police))
- Ramiz Delalić "Ćelo" (Deputy Commander of the 9th Motorized Brigade of the 1st Corps)
