= Battle of Prozor (1992) =

Bosnian War battle

- Part of the Croat–Bosniak War and Bosnian War
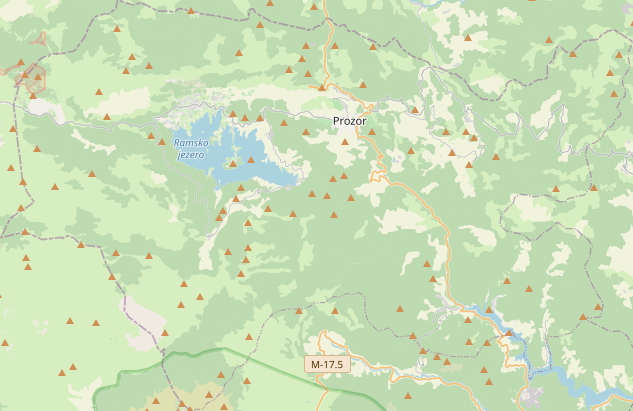
Date	23 – 25 October 1992
Location	Prozor, Bosnia and Herzegovina
Result	Croatian Defence Council Victory: Croatian Defence Council occupies Prozor

Belligerents
Croatian Republic of Herzeg-Bosnia	Republic of Bosnia and Herzegovina

Commanders and leaders
Stjepan Šiljeg; Ilija Franjić; Ivica Lučić; Zrinko Tokić	Sefer Halilović; Muharem Sabić; Fudo Hadzic; Mustafa Hero

Units involved
HVO	ARBiH

Casualties and losses
17 soldiers killed, 30 soldiers wounded	43 soldiers killed, 76 soldiers wounded
- 254 civilians killed (1992–1994)

The Battle of Prozor is one of the first battles in the Croat–Bosniak war, the battle ended with the victory of the HVO. Just as UNPROFOR was dousing the last of the embers in Novi Travnik, a conflagration was about to begin in Prozor, some 40 km directly to the south. Prozor was an unassuming town of about 15,000 Croats and Muslims, far from the frontlines and noteworthy only because it had the fortune or misfortune to sit astride the main north-south highway in Bosnia, running from the sea at Ploče to Mostar and Jablanica, through Prozor to Gornji Vakuf, and on to Jajce and western Bosnia. Fighting began in Prozor on 23 October as a gangland dispute over which mafia organization would receive a delivery of black-market gasoline.

== Battle ==
On 23 October the HVO attacked the city of Prozor with tanks, artillery, sniper fire and armored personnel carriers, and more than 1,500 missiles of different strengths fell on the city, targeting parts of the city mostly inhabited by Bosniaks. HVO forces brought up from Tomislavgrad shelled the Muslim sections of the town with artillery fire overnight. By the following morning, Prozor’s roughly 5,000 Muslims had fled southward and much of the town was reduced to a burnt-out wasteland. Members of the ARBiH were retreating from the city. The fighting stopped on 25 October 1992, with the HVO establishing control over Prozor.

== Aftermath ==
=== War crimes and prosecution ===
Croatian forces carried out numerous mass and individual massacres of the Bosniak civilian population in the area of Prozor Municipality, especially in the following settlements: Blace, Klek, Parcani, Paroš, Tolovac, Duge, Škrobućani, Tošćanica, Orašac, Lapsunj, Heljdovi, Here, Šćipe, Krančići, Donja Vast and others. First big massacre was Lapsunj massacre when HVO killed 21 Bosniak civilian on 23 August 1992.

During 1993, the HVO carried out an almost complete expulsion of the Bosniak population from the occupied territory. Military-capable Bosniaks (about 1,000) were deported to camps in Prozor or western Herzegovina. On August 28, 1993, the HVO arrested the remaining civilian population, loaded them into trucks and expelled them through the village of Kučani. Then, in a classic ghetto in the part of Prozor called Pograđe, the HVO left a total of 128 persons of Bosniak nationality to live, mostly members of the families of craftsmen who were needed to maintain the HVO's war equipment.

During the detention in the HVO camps, inmates in the Firehouse in Prozor and the High School Center were especially exposed to torture, where they were beaten and tortured to death. There are numerous statements about the shooting of Bosniak civilians in the Duška Kos area (today it is a garbage dump). Dozens of women and girls were raped, and sexual abuse of men was also recorded, including forcing them to have sex with a sow.

On 31 July 1993 members of the military police of the HVO brigade "Rama" took more than 50 inmates out of the camp in the Secondary School Center in Prozor and used them as human shields on Crni Vrh (Makljen) against members of the Army of Bosnia and Herzegovina, whom they tied up in two groups. Of these, one group of 26 inmates managed to escape to the territory under the control of the ARBiH, and the other was simply liquidated from behind by members of the HVO. Their bodies were found and exhumed from a secondary mass grave in the village of Lapsunj on 24 September 1998 (23 bodies in total).

Croatian forces completely destroyed the following Bosniak settlements: Tošćanica, Lizoperci, Grevići, Gračac, Ustirama, Heljdovi, Klek, Gračanica, Paroš, Parcani, Gorica, Škrobućani, Munikoze, Prajina, Donji and Gornji Krančići, Lug Donji and Gornji Višnjani, Blace, Here, Lapsunj, Kovačevo Polje, Varvata and Orašac. In Prozor (on the territory of the Municipality) 254 Bosniaks were killed: men, women and children.
