= Operation Neretva '93 =

1993 battle of the Croat-Bosniak War

- Part of the Croat–Bosniak War
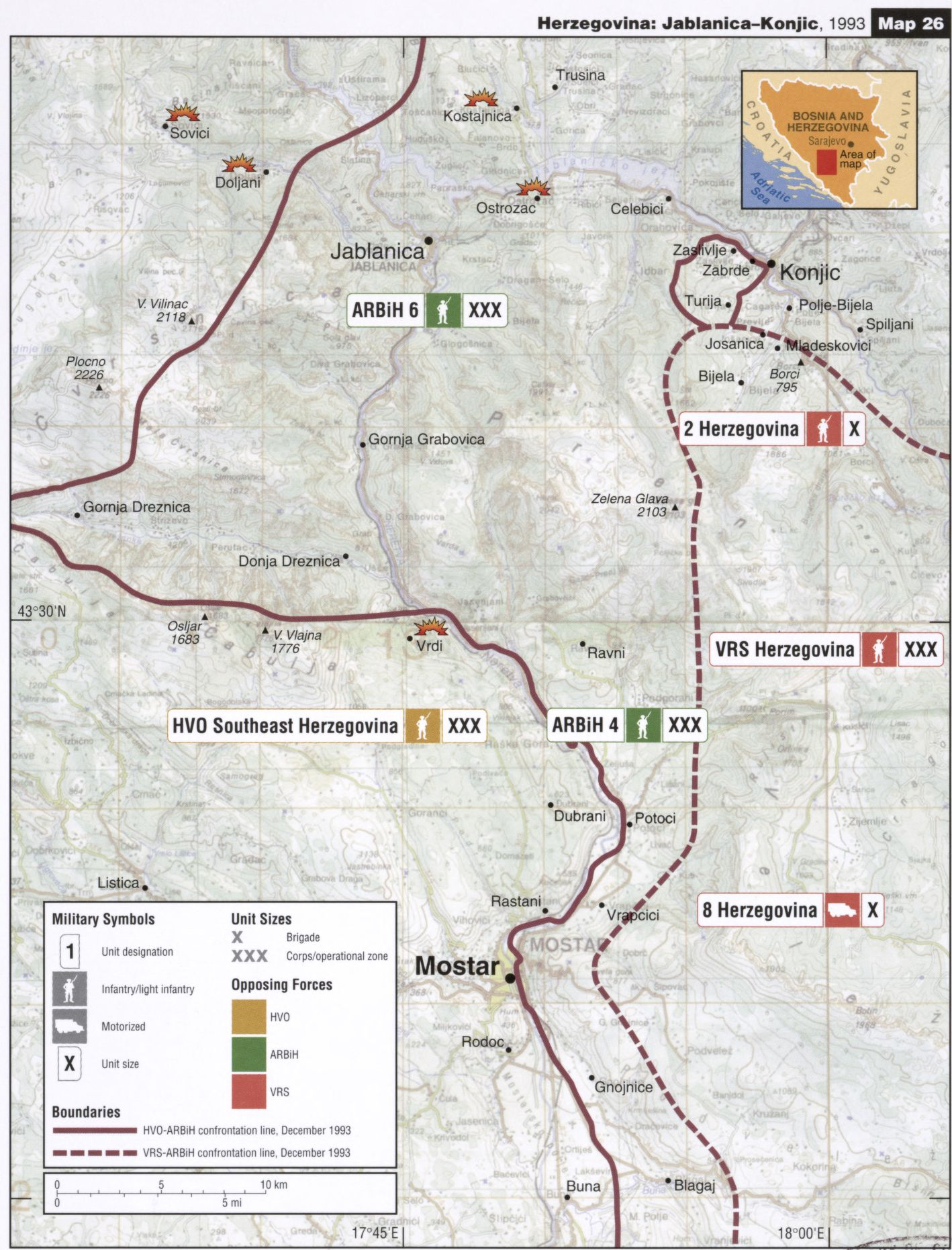
- The front lines in northern and central Herzegovina in late 1993
Date	8 September – 18 October 1993
Location	Herzegovina and central Bosnia 43°49′N 17°36′E
Result	ARBiH–VRS victory
Territorial changes	The East Bank fell under the ARBiH control; Some of ARBiH’s goals are not completed due to the operation being stopped.

Belligerents
Republic of Bosnia and Herzegovina; Republika Srpska	Croatian Republic of Herzeg-Bosnia

Commanders and leaders
(Bosnia and Herzegovina) Sefer Halilović (Bosnia and Herzegovina) Zulfikar Ališpago (Bosnia and Herzegovina) Enver Buza (Republika Srpska) Novica Gušić	(Croatian Republic of Herzeg-Bosnia) Miljenko Lasić (Croatian Republic of Herzeg-Bosnia) Željko Šiljeg

Units involved
(Bosnia and Herzegovina) ARBiH; (Bosnia and Herzegovina) 7th Muslim Brigade; Army of Republika Srpska; Herzegovina Corps	HVO

Strength
(Bosnia and Herzegovina) 5,000–7,000 soldiers	Unknown

Casualties and losses
Unknown	200 soldiers and 60 civilians killed

The Operation Neretva '93 was an Army of the Republic of Bosnia and Herzegovina (ARBiH) operation with support from Serbian forces against the Croatian Defence Council (HVO) in September 1993 on a 200 km long front from Gornji Vakuf to south of Mostar, one of its largest of the year, during the Croat–Bosniak War. The ARBiH made limited gains in the area of northern Herzegovina and around Mostar, but did not achieve a breakthrough to the southern Neretva, where the HVO retained control. The operation was halted in October. During the operation, dozens of Croat civilians were killed in the Grabovica and Uzdol massacres.

== Operation ==
After most of Gornji Vakuf was captured by the Army of the Republic of Bosnia and Herzegovina (ARBiH) in August 1993, the fighting turned towards Prozor where the Croatian Defence Council (HVO) and the ARBiH fought during the previous months in nearby villages. Neither had full control of the area so both sides spent August and September in fighting along the hills and ridges near Prozor.

In September 1993, the Bosnian Government mounted the Neretva Operation, one of its most complex efforts to date, against the HVO. Units from the 1st, 3rd, 4th and 6th Corps of the ARBiH were subordinated to Sefer Halilović for the operation. The ARBiH troops launched coordinated attacks against HVO-held enclaves in the Lašva Valley and on the entire confrontation line from south of Gornji Vakuf to Jablanica, through Mostar and further southward to the Buna River. Units of the 9th Brigade, the 10th Brigade and the 2nd Independent Battalion, all subordinated to the ARBiH 1st Corps, were sent from Sarajevo to the Jablanica sector. In the Vitez area, during a simultaneous attack from the north and south, at one point the ARBiH broke through HVO lines in Vitez, but were ultimately forced back.

Between Prozor and Jablanica, the ARBiH pushed the confrontation line slightly to the west and advanced south toward Mostar after several days of fighting. The focus of the ARBiH attack was the HVO stronghold of Vrdi near the Neretva River in order to gain control of the northern and western approaches to Mostar. In September 1993, after an artillery bombardment of Vrdi, the ARBiH infantry unsuccessfully attacked it and HVO forces managed to repel the attack. In Mostar, the ARBiH and HVO forces had clashes in the city and its Bijelo Polje and Raštani suburbs. The ARBiH made some limited gains by attacking outward from the city in three directions. The HVO responded with artillery shelling on 23 September of the eastern part of the city, controlled by the ARBiH, and an ineffective counterattack on 24 September. The use of artillery by the ARBiH and HVO further damaged the city, but neither side made significant gains. After several days of negotiations, a cease-fire was agreed on 3 October.

Throughout almost the entire operation, the ARBiH received artillery support from the Army of Republika Srpska, stationed on Mount Rošci, which shelled HVO positions near Mostar.

== Battle of Vrdi ==
The Battle of Vrdi occurred during the Bosniak-Croat conflict that broke out in the war in Bosnia and Herzegovina. It took place between 14 September and 4 October 1993 during the Army of the Republic of Bosnia and Herzegovina (ARBiH) Operation Neretva 93. While the initial ARBiH attack on the Croatian Defence Council (HVO) defenders of the village on 19 September was unsuccessful, a second assault on 4 October was more successful. The village remained on the confrontation line for the balance of the Bosniak-Croat conflict.

== Grabovica and Uzdol massacres ==
During the night of 8/9 September, the massacre in Grabovica occurred when at least 33 Croat villagers in Grabovica were killed by members of the 9th Brigade and unidentified members of the ARBiH. Three combatants, Nihad Vlahovljak, Haris Rajkić and Sead Karagić were convicted for taking part in the killings. A few days later on 14 September, the ARBiH mounted an offensive east of Prozor. During this offensive the Uzdol massacre occurred in the village of Uzdol. 70-100 Bosnian troops infiltrated past the HVO defense lines and reached the village. After capturing the HVO command post the troops went on a killing spree. It was reported that 29 Croat civilians and one prisoner of war were killed by the Prozor Independent Battalion and members of the local police force.

ARBiH commander Sefer Halilović was indicted by International Criminal Tribunal for the former Yugoslavia on the basis of superior criminal responsibility (Article 7(3) of the Statute of the Tribunal) and charged with one count of violation of the laws and customs of war (Article 3 – murder), and found not guilty.

== Aftermath ==
The HVO retained control over the area around Prozor and secured its forces' rear in western Mostar. The ARBiH managed to secure ground between Jablanica and Vrdi and take control over the road from Grabovica through Potoci and Vrapčići into northeast Mostar.

== See also ==
- Grabovica massacre
