= Seizure of Višegrad (1992) =

- Part of the Bosnian War
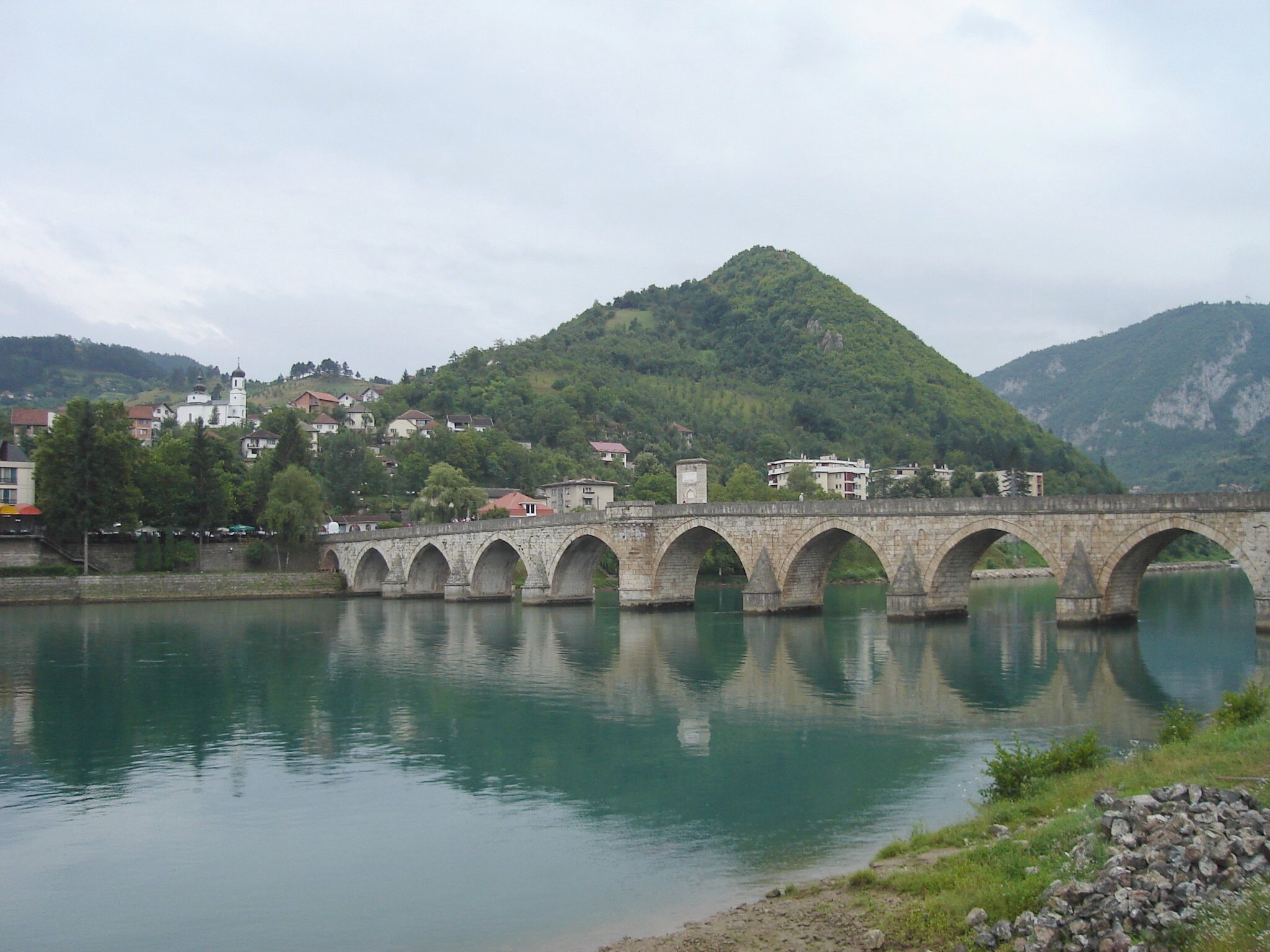
Date	7 April – 15 April 1992
Location	Višegrad, Bosnia and Herzegovina
Result	Bosnian Serb forces seized control of the town and committed many war crimes against the remaining Bosnian Muslim population

Belligerents
Republika Srpska	Bosnia and Herzegovina

Commanders and leaders
Unknown	Unknown

Units involved
Serb Territorial Defence; Serb Volunteer Guard; Police of Republika Srpska; Yugoslav People's Army; 37th Užice Corps	Bosnian Territorial Defence; Patriotic League; Bosnian Police

Strength
Around 1,100–1,200	Around 250

Casualties and losses
Unknown	Unknown

The town of Višegrad in eastern Bosnia and Herzegovina was seized by Bosnian Serb forces in April 1992 during the first days of the Bosnian War. Bosnian Serb members of the local Territorial Defence (TO), supported by local Bosnian Serb police and some members of the Yugoslav People's Army (JNA), quickly overcame heavily overmatched local Bosnian Muslim police and reserve police elements supported by some armed members of the Patriotic League. Following the seizure of the town, Bosnian Serb paramilitaries committed numerous war crimes against the remaining Bosnian Muslim population of the town and surrounding area. Several Bosnian Serb politicians and paramilitary group members were later convicted for committing war crimes and/or crimes against humanity against the Bosnian Muslim population of Višegrad by the International Criminal Tribunal for the former Yugoslavia.

== Background ==
Višegrad had been a Turkish stronghold in Bosnia where in 1571 the Ottoman Vizier of Bosnia commissioned the empire's greatest architect, Mimar Sinan, to design and build a 180 yd (160 m)–long, eleven-arch bridge over the Drina. This jewel of Turkish architecture provided the inspiration for the acclaimed book The Bridge on the Drina by Yugoslavia's only Nobel-prizewinning author, Ivo Andrić. During World War II, Chetnik forces carried out systematic massacres and ethnic cleansing of Muslim (Bosniak) civilians in eastern Bosnia, including the Višegrad region, as part of a directive to create an ethnically homogeneous Greater Serbia. Thousands of civilians were murdered, with many bodies thrown into the Drina River. Immediately before the war, the municipality had a predominantly Bosnian Muslim population: with 64 per cent being Bosnian Muslim and 32 per cent Bosnian Serb. The town had been fracturing since January 1992 when the Bosnian Serb-majority districts on the left bank of the Drina voted to join the self-proclaimed Serb Autonomous Region of Romanija while those on the right bank of the river voted to join the likewise self-proclaimed Serb Autonomous Region of Hercegovina. Višegrad's Muslims did not want to join either of the autonomous regions, as Bosnian Serb and Bosnian Muslim goals were clearly mutually exclusive. From early 1992, Bosnian Muslims in Višegrad had been disarmed or requested to surrender their weapons. Tensions rose in the first days of March, when results of the 1992 Bosnian independence referendum were announced, although they did not lead to actual violence. In Višegrad, as in a number of other communities in Bosnia and Herzegovina, the ethnic composition of the police force was a source of open dispute in the run-up to the Bosnian War. On 23 March barricades went up on the road to Goražde and shooting was heard throughout the town after Muslims attacked four Serbs on the following day. In the first week of April, barricades had been set up around the town by both Bosnian Serbs and Bosnian Muslims, and many Bosnian Muslims from outlying villages fled to Višegrad itself, and later to Goražde, 40 km (25 mi) west of Višegrad. Bosnian Muslim men in Višegrad then organised themselves into a defence group, and around the same time a paramilitary unit from rump Yugoslavia arrived in the nearby village of Dobrun.

== Fighting ==
On 7 April, Bosnian Serb members of the local Territorial Defence (TO) commenced seizing control of the town. They probably numbered around 1,000 soldiers, supported by around 100 to 200 Bosnian Serb members of the local police. They probably had support from a small number of soldiers from the Yugoslav People's Army (JNA) 37th Užice Corps. The Bosnian Muslim fighters were seriously overmatched by the Bosnian Serb forces in terms of numbers, organisation and weapons. Despite vastly exaggerated claims from the media in the Yugoslav capital Belgrade, they could call on only around 100 local Bosnian Muslim police and perhaps several dozen armed members of the Patriotic League – a paramilitary group which was the predecessor of the Army of the Republic of Bosnia and Herzegovina (ARBiH). There were no more than 250 armed Bosnian Muslims in the town, and they did not all answer to a single authority.

The details of the fighting are very unclear, but the heaviest appears to have occurred around the town police station on 8 April, and the Bosnian Serb forces also made a concerted effort to clear Bosnian Muslim fighters from the left bank of the Drina during that day. Panic spread among the Bosnian Muslim population of the town, and this was fuelled by rumours that the infamous Serb paramilitary leader, Željko Ražnatović, known as "Arkan", was approaching the town, and by the morning of 9 April the entire Muslim population had fled the town and its environs. Despite this, sporadic and isolated resistance by Bosnian Muslim fighters appears to have continued for a few days. On 11 April, "Serbian armed formations" fired thirty mortar bombs at the town, and residents fled to the slopes surrounding the town and to the JNA barracks at nearby Uzamnica. At the same time as the town was falling under Bosnian Serb control, Bosnian Serb forces appear to have eliminated a detachment of the Bosnian Muslim Green Beret paramilitary force at a roadblock near the town of Rudo on the border between Bosnia and Herzegovina and rump Yugoslavia. Bosnian Muslim resistance in the nearby villages of Dobrun and Bosanska Jagodina was overwhelmed within a few days, although Dobrun may have held out for four days before its defenders surrendered. While minor skirmishes may have continued for up to a week after the initial seizure of the town on 7 April, the Bosnian Serb forces asserted effective control over the area within 48 hours.

== Aftermath and subsequent war crimes ==
As fighting in the town and surrounding area concluded, a bizarre event occurred. A local Bosnian Muslim, Murat Šabanović, took control of the hydroelectric dam upstream from the town and threatened to blow it up with explosives. Such action would have flooded the town and much of the surrounding area. The Bosnian Serb forces attempted to negotiate via radio, but after this failed they assaulted the power station and captured Šabanović, discovering that he did not possess any explosives. He had managed to release a small amount of water from the dam, but it caused little damage.

War crimes prosecutions conducted since the conclusion of the Bosnian War have brought to light facts about the aftermath of the seizure of the town by Bosnian Serb forces. The JNA 37th Corps arrived in the town about 14 April, and by 20 April had secured all important positions in the town. and in the resulting short period of calm, many Bosnian Muslim civilians returned to their homes in the town and surrounding villages. The 37th Corps withdrew from Višegrad on 18 May, but Serb paramilitary units, including the White Eagles, Serb Volunteer Guard, and "Garavi sokak" remained in the area, joined by local Bosnian Serbs. These paramilitary groups held power in Višegrad, and looted then burned Bosnian Muslim houses to the ground. On one occasion, thousands of non-Serbs from villages around the town on both sides of the Drina were brought to the football stadium in the town, where they were searched. Those who lived on the left bank of the river were told they could return to their villages, while those who lived on the right bank were not released. Non-Serbs began to disappear from early April, and over the next few months hundreds of Bosnian Muslims were killed or disappeared. Many of those killed were thrown into the Drina, and hundreds more were later exhumed from mass graves in and around the town. The disappearances peaked in June and July 1992. Non-Serb members of the local population were also abused and humiliated, and subjected to rape and beatings. On 15 June, 45 Bosnian Muslim civilians deported from Višegrad were killed by Serb forces at a location near Paklenik, close to the village of Kalimanići in Sokolac municipality. By the end of 1992, six Muslim monuments, including the two mosques in Višegrad, were completely destroyed by fire and explosives.

Those convicted by the International Criminal Tribunal for the former Yugoslavia for war crimes and/or crimes against humanity committed against Bosnian Muslims from Višegrad and the surrounding area include:

- Radovan Karadžić, former president of Republika Srpska
- Momčilo Krajišnik, former speaker of the National Assembly of Republika Srpska
- Mićo Stanišić, former Minister of Internal Affairs of Republika Srpska
- Milan Lukić, a member of a paramilitary unit
- Sredoje Lukić, a member of a paramilitary unit
- Mitar Vasiljević, a member of a paramilitary unit
