= Konstantin Kammerhofer =

Austrian Nazi and SS-Gruppenführer

- Born: 23 January 1899; Turnau, Styria, Austria-Hungary
- Died: 29 September 1958 (age 59); Oberstdorf, West Germany
- Military career
- Allegiance: Austria-Hungary; Nazi Germany
- Branch: Austro-Hungarian Army; Schutzstaffel
- Service years: 1915–1919; 1935–1945
- Rank: SS-Gruppenführer and Generalleutnant of Police
- Commands: Higher SS and Police Leader, "Kroatien"
- Conflicts: World War I World War II
- Awards: Iron Cross, 1st and 2nd class War Merit Cross, 1st and 2nd class

Konstantin Kammerhofer (23 January 1899 – 29 September 1958) was an Austrian Nazi, an SS-Gruppenführer and the Higher SS and Police Leader in the Independent State of Croatia during the Second World War. After the war, he was convicted of war crimes in absentia by Yugoslavia. Brought to trial in Austria, he fled to Germany, went into hiding and was never brought to justice.

== Early life in Austria ==
Kammerhofer was born in Turnau, in Styria, the son of a farmer and mill owner. He attended elementary school, but left vocational school in May 1915 at the age of sixteen to join the Austro-Hungarian Army during the First World War. He was wounded three times and in early November 1918 was captured while fighting on the Italian front. Released from captivity in August 1919, he returned to Austria and found employment as a wine merchant in Graz.

In 1921 Kammerhofer joined the Austrian Nazi Party, and the Austrian Sturmabteilung (SA) in November 1933, becoming an SA-Brigadeführer in Obersteiermark. He was imprisoned several times for his illegal activities on behalf of the Party. Following the unsuccessful July 1934 putsch and the assassination of Chancellor Engelbert Dollfuss, Kammerhofer fled Austria via Yugoslavia and arrived in Nazi Germany in December 1934.

== Career in Germany ==
Kammerhofer worked in Berlin under Alfred Rodenbücher from January to March 1935 at the relief organization set up to assist Austrian Nazi refugees. He joined the Allgemeine SS on 15 February 1935 with the rank of SS-Oberführer. From April 1936 to October 1937, he was the commander of the 25th SS-Standarte, based in Essen. He next headed SS-Abschnitt (District) XXV, headquartered in Bochum from October 1937 to mid-March 1938.

A strong supporter of Austria's unification with Germany, after the Anschluss in March 1938, Kammerhofer became the first commander of SS-Abschnitt XXXI, based in Vienna, and would hold this posting until 1 October 1942. At the 10 April 1938 parliamentary election, he was elected to the Reichstag as a deputy from Ostmark and retained this seat until the fall of the Nazi regime. He applied for admission to the Nazi Party and was admitted on 1 May 1938. He also served as a city councilor in Vienna from 11 May 1939 to 31 August 1944.

== Second World War ==
On 30 January 1941, Kammerhofer was promoted to SS-Brigadeführer. He was also placed in charge of the SS-Abschnitt "Flandern" in Brussels from July 1941 to April 1942 and helped to establish the Flemish Legion. He trained in police duties with the Ordnungspolizei office in Berlin between April and August 1942, being granted the rank of Generalmajor of Police. He then was posted to Russia as the SS and Police Leader (SSPF) of "Kaukasien-Kuban" from August to November 1942, and of "Aserbeidschan", with headquarters in Baku, from November until 21 April 1943 when the position was abolished.

From Baku, Kammerhofer was transferred to Zagreb to become the Higher SS and Police Leader (HSSPF) "Kroatien" in March 1943, serving as Reichsführer-SS Heinrich Himmler's personal representative to the Croatian puppet state. He was the sole holder of this position, remaining there until the end of the war. There he worked with Croatian dictator Ante Pavelić to create a German-Croatian Police force to help maintain order. On 1 July 1943 Kammerhofer was promoted to SS-Gruppenführer and Generalleutnant of Police. On 5 December 1944, he was made Befehlshaber (Commander) of all Wehrmacht forces in Croatia. Kammerhofer also was engaged in recruiting Croatians into service in the Waffen-SS. Technically "volunteers," they were coerced to enlist, most serving with the Prinz Eugen Division in ruthless anti-partisan activities. For his services in the war, he was awarded the Iron Cross, 1st and 2nd class and the War Merit Cross with Swords, 1st and 2nd class.

Shortly after the end of the war, Kammerhofer was captured near Salzburg by American forces on 11 May 1945. He gave testimony at the Nuremberg trials and was interned until 1947. The authorities in Yugoslavia convicted him of war crimes in absentia and, when Austria began legal proceedings against him, he fled to Germany and went into hiding. He worked as a construction laborer in Hanover and was found dead in a boarding house in Oberstdorf on 29 September 1958.

== Sources ==
- Klee, Ernst (2007). Das Personenlexikon zum Dritten Reich. Wer war was vor und nach 1945. Frankfurt-am-Main: Fischer-Taschenbuch-Verlag. ISBN 978-3-596-16048-8.
- Marble, Sanders (2012). Scraping the Barrel:The Military Use of Sub-Standard Manpower. Fordham University Press. ISBN 978-0-823-23977-1.
- Thomas, Nigel (1995). Axis Forces in Yugoslavia 1941–45. Osprey Publishing. ISBN 978-1-855-32473-2.
- Yerger, Mark C. (1997). Allgemeine-SS: The Commands, Units and Leaders of the General SS. Schiffer Publishing Ltd. ISBN 0-7643-0145-4.
