= Požarnica =

- Location within Bosnia and Herzegovina
- Coordinates: 44°31′56″N 18°48′22″E
- Country: Bosnia and Herzegovina
- Entity: Federation of Bosnia and Herzegovina
- Canton: Tuzla
- Municipality: Tuzla

Area
  - Total: 3.65 sq mi (9.46 km^{2})

Population (2013)
  - Total: 190
  - Density: 52/sq mi (20/km^{2})
- Time zone: UTC+1 (CET)
  - Summer (DST): UTC+2 (CEST)

Požarnica is a village in the municipality of Tuzla, Bosnia and Herzegovina. It is located on the Majevica mountain 6 kilometers east of the city of Tuzla.

== History ==
Before the Bosnian War, Požarnica had a population of about 4,000 Bosnian Serbs. During and after the war, the Serb families relocated to the Republika Srpska entity of the country and some to neighboring Serbia. It is partially populated today by Bosniak refugees from the Drina Valley.

== Oil ==
There exists the possibility that Požarnica lies on an oil field. Oil wells were drilled in the area beginning in 1930 in the villages Rožanj and Zavid on Majevica mountain. Drilling moved to Požarnica and surrounding villages in 1934, lasting until 1941, with little evidence of the presence of oil. Another investigation took place in 1949, and 2013.

== Demographics ==
According to the 2013 census, its population was 190.

Ethnicity in 2013
Ethnicity	Number	Percentage
Serbs	110	57.9%
Bosniaks	62	32.6%
Croats	6	3.2%
other/undeclared	12	6.3%
Total	190	100%
