= Seve Dam =

- Location: Turkey
- Coordinates: 36°44′10″N 37°14′31″E

Seve Dam is a dam in Turkey. The development was backed by the Turkish State Hydraulic Works.

== See also ==
- List of dams and reservoirs in Turkey
