= Uzdol =

- Village
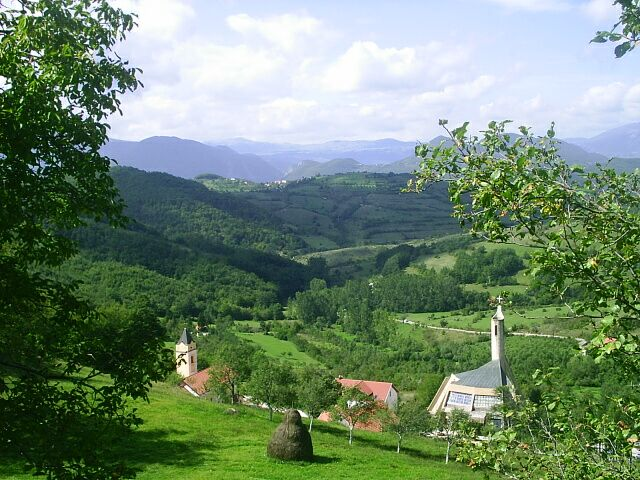

- Location within Bosnia and Herzegovina
- Coordinates: 43°48′35″N 17°41′53″E
- Country: Bosnia and Herzegovina
- Entity: Federation of Bosnia and Herzegovina
- Canton: Herzegovina-Neretva
- Municipality: Prozor

Area
  - Total: 3.37 sq mi (8.72 km^{2})

Population (2013)
  - Total: 247
  - Density: 73.4/sq mi (28.3/km^{2})
- Time zone: UTC+1 (CET)
  - Summer (DST): UTC+2 (CEST)

Uzdol is a village in Prozor-Rama municipality, Bosnia-Herzegovina. According to the census of 1991, the village has a total of 484 people with 483 Croats (99.79%) and 1 Others (00.21%).

== Demographics ==
According to the 2013 census, its population was 247.

Ethnicity in 2013
Ethnicity	Number	Percentage
Croats	246	99.6%
Serbs	1	0.4%
Total	247	100%

== See also ==
- Uzdol massacre
