= 1992 Yugoslav People's Army column incident in Sarajevo =

1992 battle of the Bosnian War

1992 JNA column incident in Sarajevo
- Part of Siege of Sarajevo
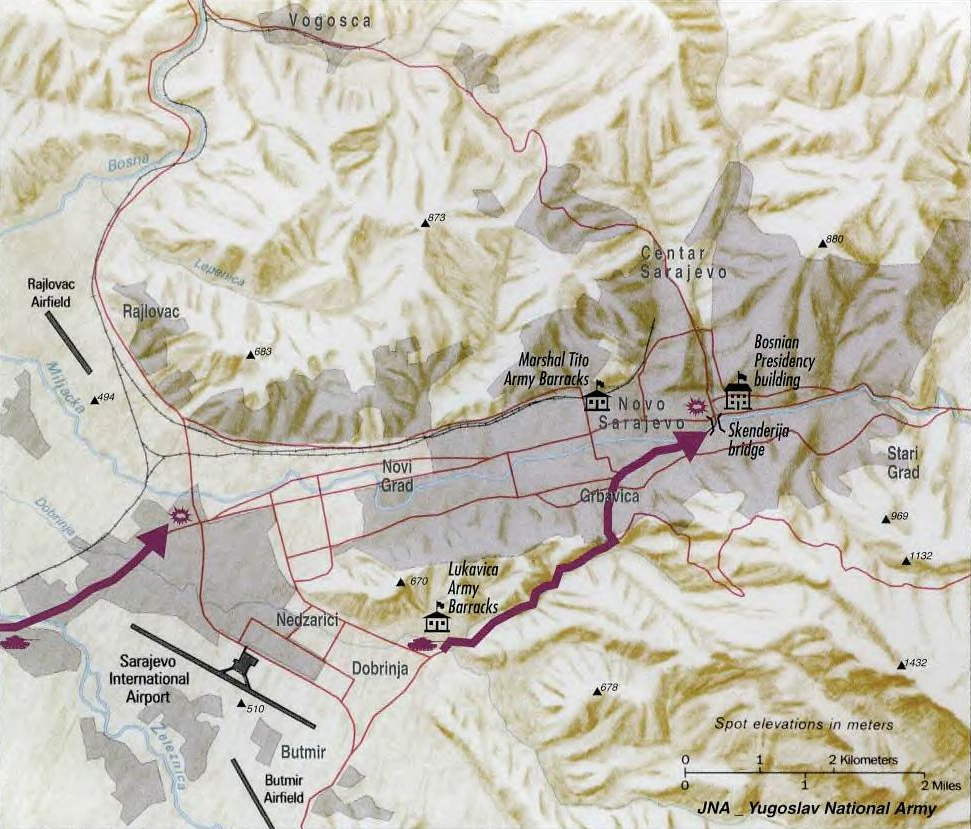
Date	3 May 1992
Location	Dobrovoljačka Street, Sarajevo, Bosnia and Herzegovina 43°51′21.5″N 18°25′17.2″E
Result	Bosnian victory: JNA column stopped; Several JNA vehicles looted

Belligerents
Bosnia and Herzegovina	FR Yugoslavia; United Nations

Commanders and leaders
Jusuf Prazina (alleged)	Milutin Kukanjac (United Nations) Lewis Mackenzie

Units involved
Bosnian Army; Green Beret militias	JNA (United Nations) UNPROFOR

Strength
~200 soldiers and police	~270 soldiers 38 vehicles (United Nations) ~10 UN Observers (United Nations) 4 vehicles

Casualties and losses
16 killed	5-9 killed 71 wounded 215 captured Numerous vehicles damaged or destroyed
- Up to 23 civilians killed

The 1992 Yugoslav People's Army column incident in Sarajevo occurred on 3 May 1992 in Dobrovoljačka Street, Sarajevo, when members of the Bosnian Army (ARBiH) attacked a convoy of the Yugoslav Army (JNA) troops that were exiting the city of Sarajevo according to the withdrawal agreement.

== Background ==
The attack is thought to have happened in retaliation for the arrest of the President of the Republic of Bosnia and Herzegovina Alija Izetbegović, who was detained at the Sarajevo Airport by the Yugoslav army the previous day.

== Attack ==
The attack occurred against a JNA convoy that was retreating and being escorted by UN peacekeeping troops. The soldiers were withdrawing from their surrounded JNA barracks in Sarajevo's old town district of Bistrik as part of what they thought was a truce and swap deal for Izetbegović. Jovan Divjak had stated that the day prior, the JNA attempted to take Sarajevo, shelling parts of the city. The city's post office was sabotaged as well, making it difficult to establish communication lines for the Bosnian army corps.

The goal was for General Milutin Kukanjac, the commander of the JNA in Sarajevo, and the soldiers to cross over to Lukavica, a settlement in the eastern part of the city, that was under Serb control at the time. The column of about 40 vehicles accompanied by UN vehicles, led by General Lewis MacKenzie, was cut off. The convoy was separated when a car was driven into it, followed by shooting. In his book Peacekeeper: The road to Sarajevo, Mackenzie described what he saw: "I could see the Territorial Defense soldiers push the rifles through the windows of civilians' cars, which were part of the convoy, and shoot [...] I saw blood flow down the windshields. It was definitely the worst day of my life."

== Aftermath ==
215 JNA soldiers were captured in the incident. 73 were wounded. General Milutin Kukanjac, the commander of the JNA in Sarajevo, stated that 5 JNA members (one soldier, three colonels and one lieutenant colonel) were killed, along with a civilian woman. The Bosnia and Herzegovina Prosecutor's Office gives a figure of 7 JNA soldiers killed, while the Republika Srpska Centre for Research of War, War Crimes and Missing Persons lists 9 JNA soldiers killed in the attack. Serb prosecutors have stated that a total of 42 JNA soldiers were killed in the attack along with the wider events on May 2 and 3 throughout Sarajevo, and have named the case that covers these events "Case Dobrovoljačka".

== Investigation and charges ==
An investigation was opened by the Serbian Prosecutors Office and has stirred controversy both in Bosnia and Herzegovina and Serbia. Two members of the State Presidency, Haris Silajdžić and Željko Komšić, claimed Serbia's action breached the Rome Agreement. The presidents attended a meeting with members of the wartime Presidency of Bosnia, namely Tatjana Ljujić-Mijatović, Ivo Komšić, Miro Lazović and Ejup Ganić, and concluded that Serbia had breached the 1996 Rome Agreement, failed to seek the ICTY's opinion before taking action and had "therefore breached international legal provisions".

A Belgrade court issued arrest warrants for 19 former Bosnian-government officials. Ejup Ganić, a former member of the Bosnian wartime presidency who was among the people sought for the attack, dismissed the allegations, indicating the attack on the JNA column was aimed at striking at Izetbegović's kidnappers after his capture by Bosnian Serb forces. Ganić was arrested in London, but was quickly released since Judge Timothy Workman ruled that the JNA was an enemy army at war with Bosnia and Herzegovina and thus, a legitimate target. In 2003 The International Tribunal for Justice dismissed the case, stating that the actions of the ArBiH did not constitute a breach of law.

On 3 March 2011, Jovan Divjak was arrested in Vienna due to Serbia's arrest warrant. However, Austria said it would not extradite him to Belgrade. In 2003, the ICTY also ruled that there was no ground for prosecution of Divjak.

In April 2022, a Sarajevo court charged Ganić and nine other former Bosniak political and military leaders with war crimes over the incident. They were accused of having "planned, attacked and incited [others to attack] the undefended convoy.. escorted by the UN peace forces", as well as having failed to either prevent the killings or punish the perpetrators of the attack. In July 2022, they pled not guilty in court.

== See also ==
- 1992 Yugoslav People's Army column incident in Tuzla
