= Grabovica massacre =

1993 mass killing during the Bosnian War

Coordinates: 43.6500°N 17.7500°E

- Part of the Bosnian War
- Location: Grabovica, Bosnia and Herzegovina
- Date: 8–9 September 1993
- Target: Croats
- Attack type: Mass murder
- Deaths: 13–33
- Perpetrator: Army of the Republic of Bosnia and Herzegovina (ARBiH)

The Grabovica massacre refers to the murders of at least 13 ethnic Croat inhabitants of the village of Grabovica near Jablanica by members of the Army of the Republic of Bosnia and Herzegovina (ARBiH) 9th Brigade and other unidentified members of ARBiH on 8 or 9 September 1993. The International Court Tribunal for former Yugoslavia concluded that the number of victims totaled 13, lower than the alleged number of 33, however other sources still maintain this higher figure.

== Background ==
To conduct combat operations in Herzegovina to lift the HVO blockade of Mostar, units of the 9th Brigade, the 10th Brigade and the 2nd Independent Battalion, all subordinated to the ARBiH 1st Corps, were sent from Sarajevo to the Jablanica sector during Operation Neretva '93 of the ARBiH. This was the area where Grabovica was situated and it was at the time the area of responsibility of the 6th Corps. The International Criminal Tribunal for the former Yugoslavia (ICTY) found that those units were deployed to Herzegovina following an order issued by Sefer Halilović.

== Murders ==
Location of Grabovica in Bosnia and Herzegovina

Grabovica was a village inhabited by Croats. It had been under ARBiH control since May 1993 and the relationship between the residents of Grabovica and the ARBiH soldiers who were stationed there was good and, as there was no other accommodation available for the arriving troops, they were supposed to be posted with the inhabitants of the village. The reputation of the arriving troops of the 9th and 10th Brigades was bad, because of "criminal and uncontrolled" elements within. According to ICTY, the evidence showed that members of both brigades not only demonstrated a lack of discipline, but also committed different forms of misappropriation (thefts etc.) The Trial Chamber noted in this respect the testimony of the 1st Corps Commander, Vahid Karavelić, who, while knowing of breaches of discipline and previous behaviour of members of these brigades, said that it never occurred to him that they might commit atrocities against civilians in Grabovica.

With the arrival of the unit of the 9th Brigade acts of violence began to occur. Throughout the night of 8 September, shooting was heard in the village, as Bosniak soldiers went house to house, murdering civilians. None of the victims were able-bodied men, but were all women and the elderly, the oldest being an 87-year old man, while the youngest victim was a four-year old girl.

The ICTY established that by the early afternoon of 9 September, a number of inhabitants had been murdered by members of the ARBiH units present in Grabovica at the time. The ICTY Trial Chamber found that it has been established beyond reasonable doubt that 13 inhabitants (Pero Marić, Dragica Marić, Ivan Zadro, Matija Zadro, Mladen Zadro, Ljubica Zadro, Mladenka Zadro, Josip Brekalo, Martin Marić, Živko Drežnjak, Ljuba Drežnjak, Ivan Mandić and Ilka Miletić), taking no active part in the hostilities, were murdered by members of the 9th Brigade and unidentified members of the ARBiH on 8 or 9 September 1993. The Trial Chamber found that the Prosecution failed to prove beyond reasonable doubt that 14 persons listed in the indictment were killed by members of the ARBiH in Grabovica at the time relevant for the Grabovica case. The Trial Chamber noted that during trial, six of the alleged victims listed in the indictment were withdrawn.

Other sources state a higher death toll of 33 civilians killed by ARBiH.

== Investigation ==
After the information about the murders had reached Sarajevo, the ARBiH started investigating the crimes. The 6th Corps Security Service, the Military Police Battalion of the 6th Corps and the Military Police of the 44th Brigade, which was located in Jablanica, were involved in the investigation into the events in Grabovica. The Chief of Security of the ARBiH Main Staff Jusuf Jašarević was informed of the results of their investigations. The ICTY found that based on the evidence, it could not be concluded that Sefer Halilović had the material ability to punish the perpetrators of the crimes committed in Grabovica.

== ICTY Trial ==
Bosnian commander Sefer Halilović was indicted by ICTY on the basis of superior criminal responsibility (Article 7(3) of the Statute of the Tribunal) and charged with one count of violation of the laws and customs of war (Article 3 – murder). Having examined all the evidence presented to it and in light of its factual findings, the ICTY found that the Prosecution did not prove beyond reasonable doubt that Halilović had effective control over the troops in Grabovica on 8 and 9 September 1993, who the Trial Chamber has found committed the crimes. Halilović was subsequently acquitted and ordered released immediately.

== Verdicts ==
In 2008, the Supreme Court of the Federation of Bosnia and Herzegovina confirmed three local court convictions of 13 years in prison against Nihad Vlahovljak, Sead Karagić and Haris Rajkić, former ARBiH soldiers for the crimes committed in Grabovica. The Court determined that Vlahovljak had ordered the killings, and the other two had carried out his orders.

In 2019, the UDIK published a book of verdicts of the Grabovica massacre.

== See also ==
- Croat–Bosniak War
