= Patriotic League (Bosnia and Herzegovina) =

Paramilitary unit

Patriotic League Patriotska Liga BiH
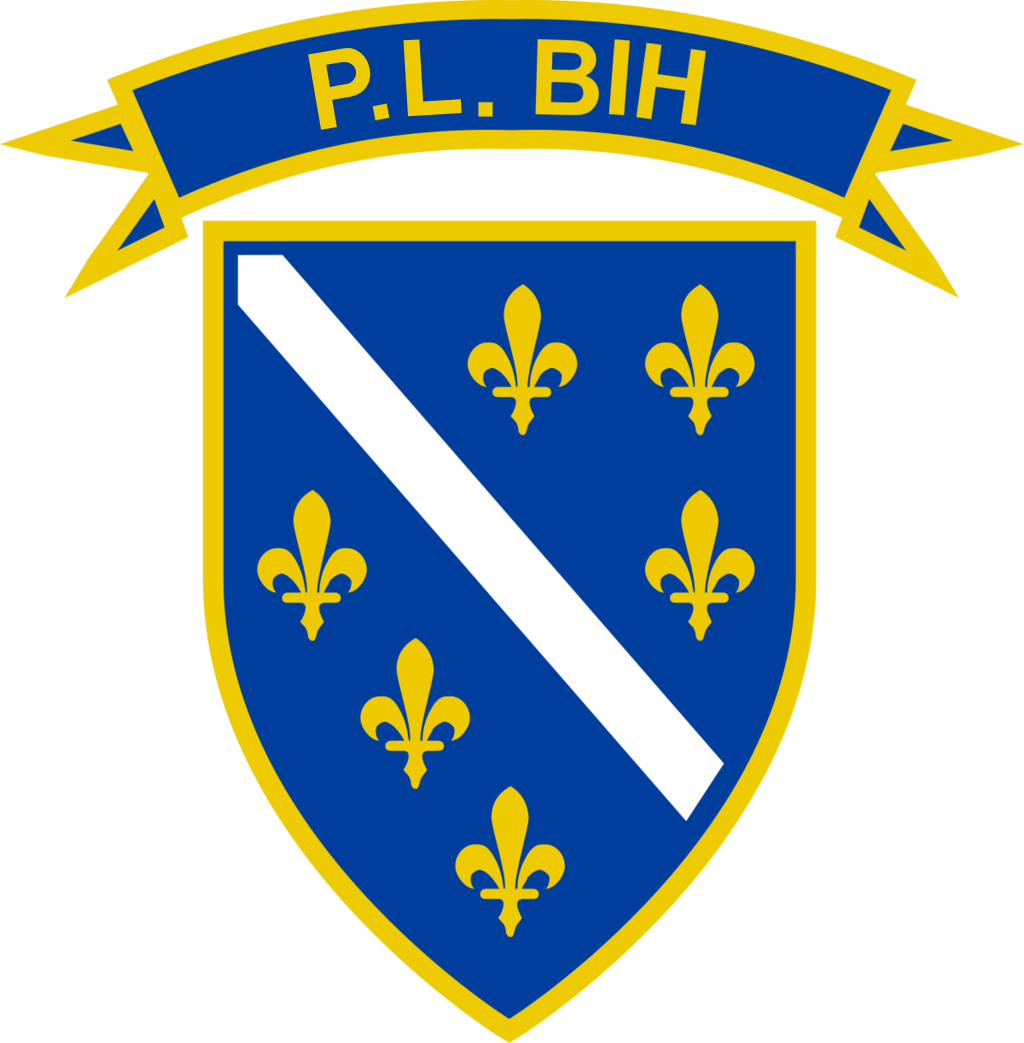
- Active: 1991–1992 (became part of the ARBiH)
- Disbanded: Incorporated into the ARBiH
- Country: Republic of Bosnia and Herzegovina
- Type: Paramilitary organization
- Size: 98,000 (March 1992)
- Garrison/HQ: Sarajevo, Republic of Bosnia and Herzegovina
- Mottos: Dušman crni mora znati, Bosna nikad neće pasti! (English: Every enemy needs to know, Bosnia will never fall!)
- Engagements: Bosnian War; Siege of Sarajevo; 1992 Yugoslav People's Army column incident in Tuzla; Operation Autumn; Operation Višegrad; Croat-Bosniak War; Operation Neretva

Commanders
- Commander: Sefer Halilović

The Patriotic League (Bosnian: Patriotska Liga) was a Bosnian paramilitary organization formed in 1991 during the breakup of Yugoslavia. It was initially organized outside the Yugoslav People's Army and was later incorporated into the Territorial Defence Force of the Republic of Bosnia and Herzegovina (TORBiH), which became the Army of the Republic of Bosnia and Herzegovina.

== History ==
On 19 December 1990, Alija Izetbegović and the officials of the Party of Democratic Action (SDA) discussed forming a military organization separate from the Yugoslav People's Army (JNA). In March 1991 Sefer Halilović organized the Patriotic League (Patriotska Liga - PL) as an independent Bosnian defence structure, using the same territorial organization as Territorial Defense Forces (TO) system. The Patriotic League was later connected to the TORBiH and, after the outbreak of the war, incorporated into the Army of the Republic of Bosnia and Herzegovina.

== Training ==
This occurred in the context of the former Yugoslav defence system, where military organization was not starting from zero: Yugoslavia's doctrine of Total National Defence relied on the JNA, republican Territorial Defence forces and large numbers of citizen-soldiers and reservists.

According to Nigel Thomas and Krunoslav Mikulan, the Patriotic League personnel received training at Croatian Special Police centres. By March 1992, the organization claimed 98,000 trained troops, organized in nine regions and 103 pre-war Opština (municipalities). Thomas and Mikulan describe the later Bosnian government forces as locally organized, hastily assembled and severely under-armed, with many units below paper strength.

The PL's early organization also drew on former JNA personnel. Sefer Halilović, who organized the PL, had been a professional JNA officer and held the rank of major before leaving the JNA in September 1991.

== Notable Units ==
- Crni Labudovi (The Black Swans)
