= Green Berets (Bosnian paramilitary) =

Bosnian paramilitary group

- Zelene beretke
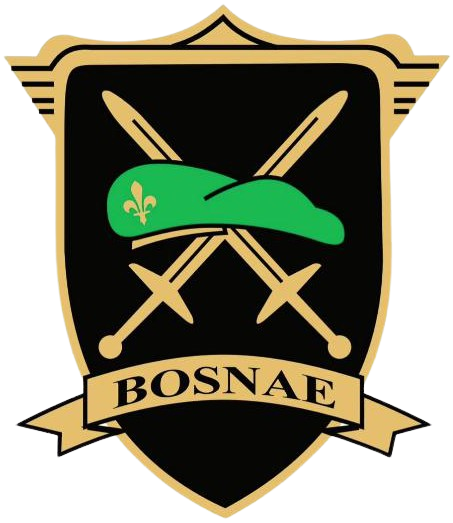
- Active: 1991–1992
- Country: Republic of Bosnia and Herzegovina
- Branch: Territorial Defence Force of the Republic of Bosnia and Herzegovina
- Type: Paramilitary (1991); Auxiliaries (1992)
- Size: 3,500
- Garrison/HQ: Sarajevo, Republic of Bosnia and Herzegovina
- Nickname: Zeleni Spartanci
- Colors
- Engagements: Bosnian War of Independence; Siege of Sarajevo; 1992 Yugoslav People's Army column incident in Sarajevo; Siege of Goražde (1992)

Commanders
- Notable commanders: Emin Švrakić, Samir Ćurt

The Green Berets (Bosnian: Zelene beretke) was a military organization founded in Sarajevo in early 1991. They were founded by demobilized soldiers and conscripts from the Yugoslav People's Army (JNA) who were mostly ethnic Bosniaks and supporters of the elected government of Bosnia and Herzegovina. They were integrated into a newly founded Army of the Republic of Bosnia and Herzegovina in the second half of 1992. The Green Berets as a gear of choice and the name was selected both as a reference to the United States Army Special Forces (the "Green Berets", although no actual relation existed) and as a common colour brand of the predominant ethnic group that composed the unit, namely Bosniaks. Bosnian Green Berets were mostly active during the war of Independence in the early part of 1992 in northern and central Bosnia.
