= Enver Mujezinović =

Enver Mujezinović (born in Foča) was a Bosnian intelligence agent.

== Yugoslav People's Army ==
He was an officer in the JNA's counter-intelligence service KOS. He was one of the KOS generations that were called "academic of his generation".

Mujezinović was the deputy and understudy of Fikret Muslimović in the 1980s. He reached the rank of major in the KOS by May 1992.

== Army of the Republic of Bosnia and Herzegovina ==
On April 15, 1992, after spending four years in Belgrade, he came to Sarajevo just as the war in Bosnia was heating up. He came with Sejo Čudić (chief of intelligence of the 16 corps of the JNA) and on April 18 they reported to Avdo Hebib, the minister of the Ministry of Internal Affairs of Bosnia and Herzegovina.

At the end of April, Jerko Doko, the defense minister and Munib Bisić the deputy defense minister empowered Mujezinović to form an intelligence agency in the Ministry of Defense of Bosnia and Herzegovina. In June 1992, the Sector for Security and Intelligence of the Ministry of Defense of the Republic of Bosnia and Herzegovina was established, and Mujezinović became its chief.

A year later he took over the position of Chief of the State Security Agency – Sarajevo Sector from Munir Alibabić, where he stayed until the formation of the Agency for Investigation and Documentation (Agencija za istraživanje i dokumentaciju - AID), where he took the position of a high-ranking agent.

== Operation Trebević ==
On 26 October 1993, Operation Trebević was launched at Mujezinović's direction. The operation led to the death of Bosnian gangster and war criminal Mušan Topalović, the arrest of Ramiz Delalić, and the firing of chief of staff Sefer Halilović.

== Later years ==
Mujezinović was arrested in 2002, the same year as Bakir Alispahić, on charges of terrorism, political murders, abuse of power, and espionage for Iran. Both he and Alispahić were released due to intervention by Alija Izetbegović.

Mujezinović has continued to work in Bosnia, both as an inspector for military equipment and as the Deputy Director of the Federation Directorate of Defence Industry Factories.
