= Sefer Halilović =

Bosnian former general and commanding officer

Personal details
- Born: 6 January 1952 (age 74) Prijepolje, PR Serbia, FPR Yugoslavia
- Party: Bosnian-Herzegovinian Patriotic Party
- Education: Military Academy

Military service
- Allegiance: Yugoslavia; Bosnia and Herzegovina
- Years of service: 1971–1993
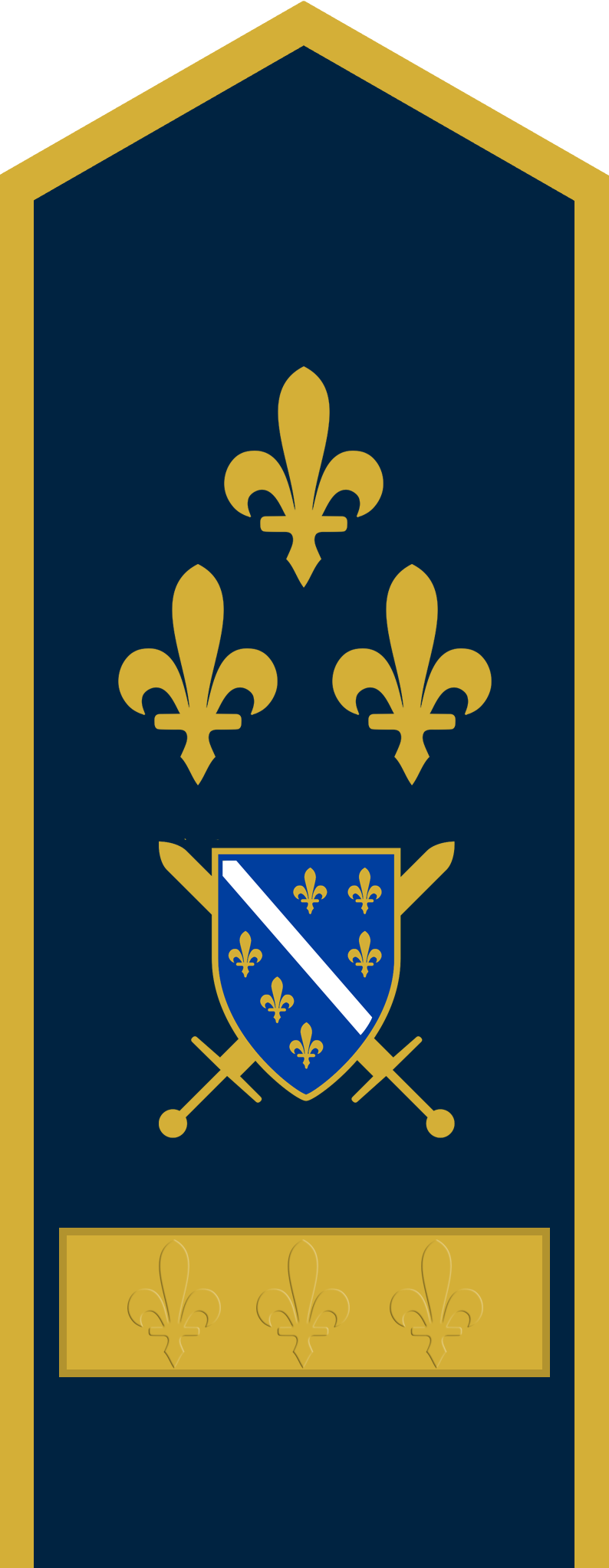
- Rank: Army General
- Unit: Patriotic League
- Commands: Patriotic League; Army of the Republic of Bosnia and Herzegovina
- Battles/wars: Bosnian War; 1992 Yugoslav campaign in Bosnia; Siege of Sarajevo; Battle of Pofalići; Battle of Mojmilo Ridge; Battle of Žuč; Siege of Goražde; Croat–Bosniak War; Siege of Mostar; Battle of Prozor (1992); Lašva Valley counteroffensive; Battle of Travnik (1993); Battle of Bugojno; Battle of Gornji Vakuf; Operation Neretva '93

Sefer Halilović (born 6 January 1952 in Prijepolje) is a Bosnian former general and commanding officer of the Bosnian Army during the 1992–95 war in Bosnia and Herzegovina. In 2001, he was indicted for war crimes by the International Criminal Tribunal for the former Yugoslavia. He was acquitted of all charges in 2005.

== Early life and education ==
Halilović was born in Taševo, a hamlet in the Prijepolje municipality in the Zlatibor District geographical region of Sandžak, then part of Yugoslavia. He attended the military academy in Belgrade in 1971 for three years and in 1975 he attended the military school in Zadar where he became an Officer in the Yugoslav People's Army (JNA). From 1980 until the 1992–95 war he served in Vinkovci as an Army security officer. On 31 August 1990 he went to Belgrade and attended a two-year course at the school for commanders.

== Career ==
When Halilović left the Yugoslav People's Army in September 1991 he was a professional military officer and held the rank of major. He went to Bosnia and Herzegovina, created the Patriotic League and planned the defense of the country.

=== War years ===
On 25 May 1992 he was appointed by the Presidency of Bosnia and Herzegovina (RBiH) as Commander of the Territorial Defence (TO) Staff of the RBiH, replacing Hasan Efendić, becoming the most senior military commander of the armed forces of the RBiH.

From his appointment in May to early July, while the TO evolved into an Army, Halilović also acted as a member of the War Presidency. After July 1992, he functioned as the Chief of the General Staff of the Army of the Republic of Bosnia and Herzegovina. On 18 August 1992, the Presidency formed five corps of the ABiH with Halilović as Chief of the Supreme Command Staff / Chief of the Main Staff. On 8 June 1993, a new position was created, Commander of the Supreme Command Staff. Rasim Delić filled this post. From 18 July 1993 to 1 November 1993, he held the post of Deputy Commander of the Supreme Command Staff of the ARBiH as well as Chief of the Supreme Command Staff.

After a meeting in Zenica on 20–21 August 1993, Rasim Delić appointed him Head of an Inspection Team. At that same meeting he urged his fellow officers to prioritize the disciplining of BH soldiers. He was quoted as saying; "When are we going to start shooting people for not following orders?"

==== Assassination attempt ====
On 7 July 1993, a targeted explosion occurred at Halilović's apartment, killing his wife Mediha and her brother Edin Rondić. While initial official reports claimed the hit was a Serbian shell, Sefer Halilović has claimed that the assassination was a state-sponsored hit ordered by the SDA leadership and executed by the "Ševe" unit.

In the documentary series Generali, Halilović identified the SDA's secret police as the organizers who used a remote-controlled bomb to eliminate him, later falsifying the ballistic reports to hide their involvement. According to Halilović, the narrative of a Serbian shell was a deliberate cover-up for a domestic political liquidation.

It was alleged that Rasim Delić, along with Fikret Muslimović, and Bakir Alispahić ordered Sefer's failed assassination which was attempted by two members of the secret state security group known as "Ševe", and their commander Nedžad Ugljen, also the director of the state security service or SDB.

== War crimes indictment, trial and acquittal ==
Before his indictment Halilović was a government minister in the Federation of Bosnia and Herzegovina and the leader of his own political party, the Bosnian-Herzegovinian Patriotic Party-Sefer Halilović and was known for his vocal criticism of Bosnian president Alija Izetbegović. He was indicted by the International Criminal Tribunal for the Former Yugoslavia on 30 July 2001. He voluntarily surrendered on 25 September 2001 and pleaded not guilty two days later. Halilović was on a provisional release from 13 December 2001 until the beginning of the trial.

=== Charge ===
Halilović was indicted on the basis of superior criminal responsibility (Article 7(3) of the Statute of the Tribunal) and charged with one count of violation of the laws and customs of war (Article 3 – murder). The massacre he was accused of being responsible for took place in villages of Grabovica and Uzdol in September 1993. The ICTY prosecutors claimed that he was leader of Operation Neretva '93 which was conducted by the ARBiH in the area.

=== Trial ===
The trial against Sefer Halilović began on 31 January 2005. The prosecution completed its case on 2 June. There were 39 prosecution witnesses and two witness statements. The Trial Chamber admitted 287 exhibits tendered into evidence by the prosecution. The defence case commenced on 27 June and lasted until 14 July 2005. There were three defence witnesses and twelve witness statements. The parties made their closing arguments on 30 and 31 August 2005. The Trial Chamber admitted 207 exhibits tendered into evidence by the defence. Halilović's defence showed that he had no effective control and no commanding role over the perpetrators, but was a notional inspector without proper authority.

During court proceedings, Faruk Balijagić, Halilović's Sarajevo-based lawyer, alleged that Alija Izetbegović, the former president of Bosnia and Herzegovina and Delić's boss, attempted to discredit Halilović by framing him for the massacres of civilians through mostly false documents provided by the security service Directors: Munir Alibabić (SBD Director), Fikret Muslimović (SVB Director), Nedžad Ugljen (commander of "Ševe" and Director of SDB), Jusuf Jašarević (SVB Director), Enver Mujezinović (SDB in Sarajevo Director) and Bakir Alispahić (minister of MUP). It has been alleged that the secret service agents bribed numerous witnesses for false account of what actually took place and that Halilović is simply a scapegoat.

=== Verdict and appeals ===
On 16 November 2005, Halilović was acquitted on all charges and released. The Court found that, while murders considered war crimes did occur at those places, Halilović did not have command authority, being only an inspector, and that he cannot be considered responsible for them. The prosecution appealed the verdict. On 16 October 2007 the appeals chamber ruled against the prosecution appeal and confirmed the acquittal verdict rendered almost two years earlier by the trial chamber.

== Other ==
In 1996, Halilović founded his own political party the Bosnian-Herzegovinian Patriotic Party-Sefer Halilović. In 1997 Halilović published his memoir Lukava Strategija (Cunning Strategy). He served as the Minister of Refugees and Displaced Persons in the government of the Federation of Bosnia and Herzegovina between 1998 and 2001. In 2005 Halilović's son, Semir, published a book Državna Tajna which described some of the events which shaped wartime Bosnia. In April 2006 Semir Halilović was accosted and threatened with death by one of the people whom the book cast in a bad light, Ramiz Delalić (now deceased), who was also a prosecution witness during his father's trial. On 1 October 2006, Sefer Halilović was elected to a four-year term in the Parliamentary Assembly of Bosnia and Herzegovina.
