= Territorial Defence Force of the Republic of Bosnia and Herzegovina =

Defunct armed force of Bosnia and Herzegovina

- Teritorijalna odbrana Republike Bosne i Hercegovine (T.O. BiH)
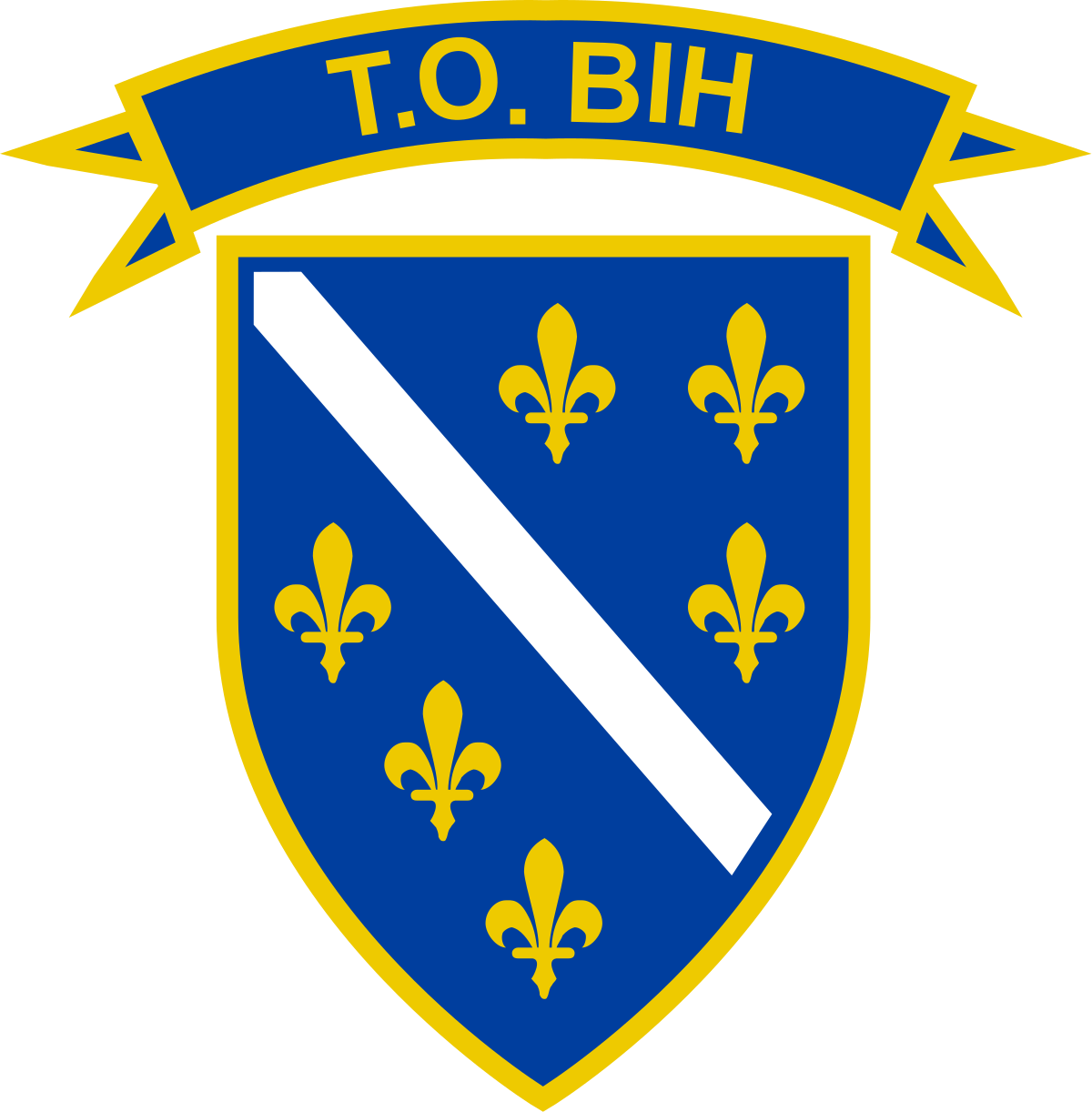
- Active: 1990–1992 (became part of the ARBiH)
- Disbanded: Incorporated into the ARBiH
- Country: Republic of Bosnia and Herzegovina
- Type: Paramilitary organization
- Garrison/HQ: Sarajevo, Republic of Bosnia and Herzegovina
- Engagements: Yugoslav Wars: Bosnian War

The Territorial Defence Force of the Republic of Bosnia and Hercegovina (Bosnian: Teritorijalna odbrana Republike Bosne i Hercegovine (T.O. BiH)) were the first official armed forces of the Republic of Bosnia and Herzegovina at the beginning of the Bosnian War. They were eventually transformed into the Army of the Republic of Bosnia and Herzegovina.

== History ==
The Territorial Defense (Serbo-Croatian: Teritorijalna odbrana; TO for short) was the name of a local defence reserve force in the former Yugoslav People's Army (JNA) for the protection of the territorial integrity of Bosnia and Herzegovina. The TO were organized in their respective country with a separate command that of the JNA. The TO was a Civilian Home Guard, roughly like a paramilitary or a reserve military force. The regions of the TO were in charge of mobilization with the help of the local population.

== TORBiH in Bosnia ==
The TO was the official army of Bosnia and Herzegovina, along with the separate Bosnian military forces formed by Sefer Halilović the Patriotic League (PL). The TO, from 1991 to April 1992, absorbed all units of the PL and districts military formations into the TO, which was eventually transformed at the end of May 1992 into the Army of the Republic of Bosnia and Herzegovina.

== Organization ==
The TO was organized into seven regions (two refused to join the TORBiH), each controlling about 12 districts (totaling 73 districts, 36 refused to join). On April 15, 1992 all PL units joined the TORBiH.

At the end of April 1992, the TO was reorganized into four regions (Bihać, Sarajevo, Tuzla and Zenica) and two tactical groups that controlled TO, PL and newly formed brigades. The Sarajevo TO was transformed in the general headquarters. There were soon 26 brigades (named after districts).

On 20 May 1992 the TORBiH was renamed the Army of the Republic of Bosnia and Herzegovina.

== TORBiH command ==
=== April 1992 – May 1992 ===
TORBiH General Headquarters, Sarajevo

- Colonel Hasan Efendić (Commander of the TORBiH)
- Colonel Stjepan Šiber (Chief of Staff)
- Colonel Jovan Divjak (Deputy Chief of Staff)

Regional staff commanders:

- Tuzla- Enver Delibegović
- Zenica- Mirsad Ibraković
- Mostar- Šemsudin Hasić
- Bihać- Hajrudin Osmanagić

== TORBiH units ==
=== March 1991 – March 1992 ===
Independent detachments throughout Bosnia all under the control of the TORBiH.
