= Siege of Sarajevo =

Siege during the Bosnian War (1992–1996)

Coordinates: 43.8476°N 18.3564°E

- Part of the Bosnian War in the Yugoslav Wars
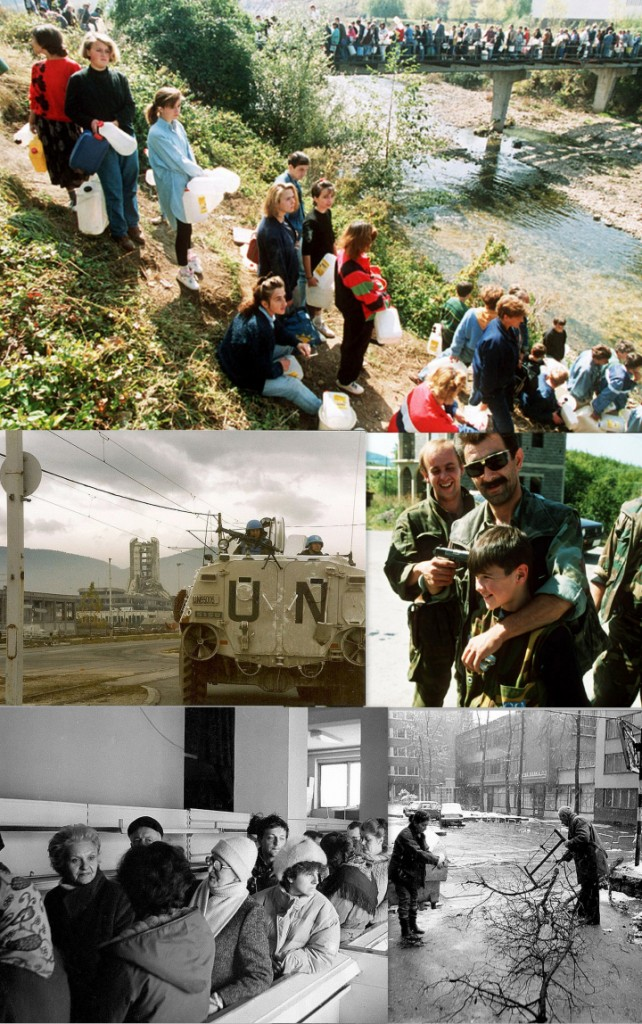
- Clockwise from top left: Residents queue for water; a Serb commander jokingly points a gun at his son during a prisoner exchange, summer 1992; residents cut trees for firewood, winter 1992-1993; residents of Baščaršija receive UNHCR aid; a Norwegian UNPROFOR armoured vehicle patrolling part of the infamous Sniper Alley.
Date	5 April 1992 (Note: 5 April 1992 was the date of the first attack which was launched on Sarajevo by the JNA and Serb paramilitaries and it is also considered the starting date of the siege. However, as early as 2 March 1992, barricades and gunmen started to appear on the streets of Sarajevo.) – 29 February 1996 (Note: 29 February 1996 was declared the official ending date of the siege by the Bosnian government. The war ended with the signing of the Dayton Accords on 21 November 1995 and the signing of the Paris Protocol on 14 December 1995. However, the Serbs had not yet implemented the Dayton deal which required them to withdraw from areas to the north and west of Sarajevo as well as other parts of the city and as a result, the Bosnian government did not declare that the siege was over. The Serbs also violated the Dayton Peace Accords by firing a rocket-propelled grenade (RPG) at a Sarajevo tram on 9 January 1996, killing 1 and wounding 19.) (3 years, 10 months, 3 weeks and 3 days)
Location	Sarajevo, Republic of Bosnia and Herzegovina
Result	Military stalemate: Ceasefire; Dayton Agreement signed; JNA withdraws from Sarajevo; city encircled by Bosnian Serb forces; ARBiH unable to lift the siege; UN assumes control of International Airport for Operation Provide Promise; Joint NATO-UN intervention following second Markale market massacre
Territorial changes	Eastern Sarajevo and Sarajevo divided by RS and FBiH, respectively.; 65% of buildings heavily damaged or destroyed overall.

Belligerents
Republic of Bosnia and Herzegovina; Supported by: Pakistan (intelligence support and military equipment); Croatian Republic of Herzeg-Bosnia	UN (1992-1995): France; United Kingdom; Canada; Russia; Norway; Netherlands; Sweden; Denmark; Egypt; Ukraine; Ireland; NATO (1995-1996): United States; United Kingdom; France; Germany; Italy; Spain; Portugal; Ukraine (Non-NATO contributor); Egypt (Non-NATO contributor)	Socialist Federal Republic of Yugoslavia (April–May 1992) Republika Srpska (May 1992–1996); Supported by: Federal Republic of Yugoslavia (diplomatic, intelligence support and military equipment)

Commanders and leaders
Bosnian Army: Alija Izetbegović (POW) (April–May 1992); Hakija Turajlić †; Sefer Halilović; Rasim Delić; Jovan Divjak; Dragan Vikić; Enver Hadžihasanović; Mustafa Hajrulahović; Vahid Karavelić; Nedžad Ajnadžić; Mušan "Caco" Topalović †; Ismet "Ćelo" Bajramović (WIA); Jusuf "Juka" Prazina; Ramiz Delalić; Zaim Imamović †; Enver Šehović †; Esad Pelko; Croatian Defence Council: Vladimir Šaf; Ivan Vulić	UN (1992-1995): Bernard Janvier; François Mitterrand; (Canada) Lewis MacKenzie; NATO (1995-1996): (United States) Leighton W. Smith	Yugoslav People's Army (April–May 1992): Milutin Kukanjac; Army of Republika Srpska (May 1992–1996): Radovan Karadžić; Ratko Mladić; Milan Gvero; Momir Talić; Tomislav Šipčić; Stanislav Galić; Dragomir Milošević; Željko Ražnatović

Units involved
Bosnian Army: 1st Corps; 3rd Corps; 4th Corps; 7th Corps; Green Berets (1992); Patriotic League; Black Swans; Militia; Local police; Irregulars; Croatian Defence Council: Kralj Tvrtko Brigade; 101st Battalion "Do Drine"	UN (1992-1995): UNPROFOR; (France) French Army; (United Kingdom) British Army; (Canada) Canadian Army; (Russia) Russian Army; (Norway) Norwegian Army; Royal Netherlands Army; (Sweden) Swedish Army; (Denmark) Royal Danish Army; (Egypt) Egyptian Army; (Ukraine) Ukrainian Ground Forces; (Republic of Ireland) Garda Síochána; NATO (1995-1996): Air campaign (1995); (United States) U.S. Air Force; (France) French Air Force; (United Kingdom) Royal Air Force; (Germany) German Air Force; (Spain) Spanish Air Force; IFOR (1995-1996); (France) French Army; (Italy) Italian Army; (Portugal) Portuguese Army; (Ukraine) Ukrainian Ground Forces (Non-NATO contributor); (Egypt) Egyptian Army (Non-NATO contributor)	Yugoslav Ground Forces (April–May 1992): Second Military District; 4th Corps; Army of Republika Srpska (May 1992–1996): General Staff; 1st Guards Motorized Brigade; 65th Protection Motorized Regiment; Sarajevo-Romanija Corps; 1st Sarajevo Mechanized Brigade; Serb Guard Ilidža; Herzegovina Corps; Russian Volunteers; Ukrainian Volunteers

Strength
Republic of Bosnia and Herzegovina Army: ~73,141 soldiers, militia fighters, local police and irregulars; Limited number of heavy equipment, armoured vehicles (incl. improvised) and tanks; Croatian Defence Council: ~2,000 soldiers	UN (1992-1995): UNPROFOR; 4,600 total personnel; Rapid Reaction Force (1995); France; 2,000 soldiers; 8 AMX-30 AuF1 self-propelled artillery; United Kingdom; 1,500 soldiers; 12 L118 light gun towed howizers; Netherlands; 500 soldiers; NATO (1995-1996): Air campaign (1995); United States (Note: On 5 August 1994, two US A-10 aircraft strafed Serb targets. On 25–26 May 1995, two US F-16s participated in the 1995 Pale air strikes); F-16 fighter aircraft; A-10 ground-attack aircraft; MQ-1 Predator drones; France (Note: See Operation Deliberate Force); Mirange 2000N ground-attack aircraft; United Kingdom (Note: On 22 September 1994, two British SEPECAT Jaguar aircraft struck near a Serb tank, destroying it.); Jaguar ground-attack aircraft; Germany (Note: Unknown date. Six interdictor-strike version Tornados, escorted by eight ECR Tornados, pinpointed Serb targets around Sarajevo for the Rapid Reaction Force artillery to attack.); Tornado ground-attack aircraft; Spain (Note: On 25–26 May 1995, Spanish EF-18As conducted strikes near Pale 1995 Pale air strikes); EF-18A Hornet fighter aircraft; IFOR (1995-1996); Unknown (Note: The highest figure across Bosnia is 60,000 troops by February 1996. The number of troops within Sarajevo is not specified.)	Yugoslav Ground Forces (April–May 1992): 15,000-20,000 soldiers; Numerous tanks and armoured vehicles; Army of Republika Srpska (May 1992-1996): 23,000 soldiers (Note: Estimated to be 6-13 brigades. 8 or 10 brigades are widely accepted.); 1,700 howizers, mortars, rocket launchers, assault guns; 500 anti-aircraft weapons, machine guns; 150 APCs; 100 tanks; 1 captured French APC (Note: Captured during Battle of Vrbanja Bridge.); 1 captured Canadian APC

Casualties and losses
Republic of Bosnia and Herzegovina: 6,137 killed; 3,587 wounded; Croatian Republic of Herzeg-Bosnia: Unknown	UN (1992-1995): UNPROFOR; France (Note: Two killed by gunfire on 27 May 1995. Two killed by sniper fire, on 14 and 15 August 1995, respectively; the latter who was erecting anti-sniper barricades. Two killed by shelling during humanitarian aid convoy on 23 July 1995. Three killed while defusing 90 mm tank shell on 23 April 1995. Nine killed during road accident on 14 March 1995. 1 killed during road accident on 19 August 1995. 1 killed during road accident on 16 September 1995. One wounded by gunfire on 3 December 1993 while protecting humanitarian aid convoy. One wounded by mortar fire at a UN compound on 2 July 1995. One wounded by sniper fire on 11 May 1995. 2 wounded by sniper fire on 7 June 1995. 1 wounded by mine or unexploded shell on 6 January 1996. 17 wounded by gunfire on 27 May 1995 during Battle of Vrbanja Bridge. 12 taken hostage on 27 May 1995 during Battle of Vrbanja Bridge. ~20 Foreign Legion taken hostage during capture of UN Lukevitza barracks on 27 May 1995. 1 AMX-10 RC damaged during an attack on 23 September 1994. 1 APC captured during Battle of Vrbanja Bridge.); 20 killed (11 in accidents); 25 wounded; ~32 held hostage; 1 AMX-10 RC damaged; 1 APC captured; Ireland (Note: Two police officers involved in road accident on 19 May 1995.); 1 killed (in accident); 1 injured (in accident); Canada (Note: On 15 April 1994, 16 Canadian soldiers were captured from observation posts where they were monitoring Serb heavy weapons. The soldiers were held hostage by Bosnian-Serb forces in a school on the outskirts of the city); 15 wounded; 16 held hostage; 1 AVGP captured; Ukraine (Note: On 5 August 1994, a Ukrainian soldier guarding the Illidža Weapons Collection site was injured during a raid by Bosnian Serb forces. On 8 September 1996, a Ukrainian soldier guarding an election ballot warehouse sustained a gunshot wound.); 2 wounded; Sweden (Note: On 27 May 1995, Swedish Major was taken hostage during capture of UN Lukevitza barracks by Bosnian Serb forces.); 1 held hostage; Denmark (Note: On 27 May 1995, Danish Captain was taken hostage during capture of UN Lukevitza barracks by Bosnian Serb forces.); 1 held hostage; Humanitarian airlift; Italy; 1 Aeritalia G.222 transport aircraft; 4 killed; NATO (1995-1996): Air campaign (1995); France; 1 Mirage 2000N aircraft; 2 pilots captured; United States; 1 MQ-1 Predator drone; IFOR (1995-1996); Portugal; 2 killed; 1 wounded; Italy; 1 killed; 6 wounded; United Kingdom; 2 wounded; United States; 1 wounded; France (Note: One wounded by unexploded ordinance on 6 January 1996.); 1 wounded	SFR Yugoslavia (Note: April 20, 1992: 2 killed. April 22: 8 killed in Dobrinja after APC broke down. May 2: Ambushes across the city resulted in 18 killed. The remaining 5-9 fatalities were from 1992 Yugoslav People's Army column incident in Sarajevo.) (April–May 1992): 33-37 killed; 71 wounded; 215 captured; Numerous vehicles damaged or destroyed; Republika Srpska (Note: One tank recorded to have been destroyed by British aircraft. Four tanks destroyed during the Battle of Mojmilo Ridge. On August 5, 1994, two US A-10 Thunderbolts strafed and destroyed one anti-air vehicle) (May 1992-1996): 2,241 killed; 5 tanks destroyed; 1 anti-air vehicle destroyed
- 5,434 civilians killed or missing (incl. 1,601 children); 56,000 injured (incl. 15,000 children); 55,000-145,980 expelled from the city (Note: Pre war (1991) population of 435,000-525,980. A census reported a population decrease from 300,000-380,000 after the war.)

The Siege of Sarajevo (Serbo-Croatian: Opsada Sarajeva / Опсада Сарајева) was a prolonged military blockade of Sarajevo, the capital of the Republic of Bosnia and Herzegovina, during the Bosnian War. Beginning on 5 April 1992, the capital was surrounded by Bosnian Serb forces following the outbreak of the Bosnian War. After the withdrawal of the Yugoslav People's Army (JNA) from Bosnia and Herzegovina, much of its Bosnian Serb personnel, weaponry and equipment were transferred to the newly established Army of Republika Srpska (VRS), which continued the blockade. The siege lasted until 29 February 1996, spanning 1,425 days. It was nearly twice as long as the siege of Leningrad and is widely regarded as the longest siege of a capital city in the history of modern warfare.

Following the declaration of independence of the Republic of Bosnia and Herzegovina from Yugoslavia after the 1992 independence referendum, Bosnian Serb forces encircled Sarajevo with an initial force of approximately 13,000 soldiers, establishing strategic positions in the surrounding hills. The political objective of the Bosnian Serb leadership was to establish a Bosnian Serb state, Republika Srpska (RS), encompassing territories inhabited by Bosniaks and other non-Serb populations. The besieging forces imposed a military blockade on the city and subjected it to sustained bombardment using artillery, tanks, mortars, and small arms, including sniper fire. An estimated 500,000 shells were fired at Sarajevo over the course of the siege.

The Army of the Republic of Bosnia and Herzegovina (ARBiH), alongside elements of the Croatian Defence Council (HVO), maintained a force of approximately 70,000 troops within Sarajevo. Despite its considerable manpower, the ARBiH was significantly outmatched in heavy weaponry. At the beginning of the siege, Bosnian Serb forces controlled several suburbs surrounding the city, including Ilidža, Nedžarići, and parts of Grbavica. Meanwhile, other areas of Sarajevo experienced intense urban combat, characterized by street-to-street fighting. Clashes were particularly fierce during the opening months of the siege, although direct engagements became less frequent as the conflict progressed. The ARBiH retained control over much of central and eastern Sarajevo, although several neighbourhoods along the city's outskirts remained vulnerable to Bosnian Serb positions. Repeated attempts by the ARBiH to break through the encirclement proved unsuccessful, resulting in substantial casualties among its defenders.

The intensity of the attacks made Sarajevo one of the most dangerous cities for civilians, including children, who faced the daily risk of death or injury from indiscriminate shelling and sniper fire while moving through the city. United Nations (UN) and Implementation Force (IFOR) personnel stationed in the city also faced considerable danger during peacekeeping, humanitarian and peace enforcement operations, suffering fatalities and injuries from artillery fire, sniper attacks, land mine explosions, unexploded ordnance detonations and assaults. Humanitarian aid aircraft participating in Operation Provide Promise were also frequently targeted by ground fire. On 3 September 1992, an Italian Aeritalia G.222 transport aircraft was shot down by a shoulder-fired surface-to-air missile while approaching Sarajevo. The aircraft crashed approximately 35 kilometres west of the city, killing all four crew members.

A total of 13,952 people were killed during the siege, including 5,434 civilians. Among the military casualties, the ARBiH suffered 6,137 fatalities, while the VRS lost 2,241 soldiers. According to the 1991 census, Sarajevo and its surrounding areas had a combined population of 525,980. Estimates of the population within the city proper before the siege ranged from 435,000. Following the siege, Sarajevo's population was estimated to have fallen to between 300,000 to 380,000. During certain periods of the siege, residents endured prolonged shortages of essential utilities, with some areas experiencing interruptions to gas, electricity, and water supplies lasting up to six months.

Following the second Markale massacre on 28 August 1995, NATO initiated Operation Deliberate Force, a sustained air campaign targeting Bosnian Serb military positions across Bosnia and Herzegovina, including those in the vicinity of Sarajevo. The campaign, combined with mounting international pressure, contributed to the eventual cessation of hostilities. A ceasefire took effect in October 1995, followed by the signing of the Dayton Peace Agreement on 14 December 1995. The siege was officially declared over on 29 February 1996, although the transfer of Serb-controlled Sarajevo suburbs and the city's reunification continued into March 1996.

After the war, the International Criminal Tribunal for the former Yugoslavia (ICTY) found that Bosnian Serb forces carried out a sustained campaign of sniping and shelling that deliberately targeted civilians, as well as indiscriminate and disproportionate attacks across the city, resulting in thousands of civilian death and injuries. Four Bosnian Serb officials were convicted for numerous counts of crimes against humanity committed during the siege, including terrorism. Stanislav Galić and Dragomir Milošević were sentenced to life imprisonment and 29 years imprisonment respectively. Their superiors, Radovan Karadžić and Ratko Mladić, were also convicted and sentenced to life imprisonment.

== Background ==
From its establishment after World War II until its breakup in 1991 and 1992, the government of the Socialist Federal Republic of Yugoslavia suppressed the nationalist sentiments which existed among the many ethnic and religious groups which comprised the population of the country, a policy which prevented the occurrence of chaos and the breakup of the state. When Yugoslavia's longtime leader Marshal Josip Broz Tito died in 1980, this policy of containment underwent a dramatic reversal. Nationalism experienced a renaissance in the following decade after violence erupted in Kosovo. While the goal of Serbian nationalists was the centralization of a Serb-dominated Yugoslavia, other nationalities in Yugoslavia aspired to federalization and the decentralization of the state.

On 18 November 1990, the first multi-party parliamentary elections were held in Bosnia and Herzegovina (with a second round on 25 November). They resulted in a national assembly dominated by three ethnically based parties, which had formed a loose coalition to oust the communists from power. Croatia and Slovenia's subsequent declarations of independence and the warfare that ensued placed Bosnia and Herzegovina and its three constituent peoples in an awkward position. A significant split soon developed on the issue of whether to stay with the Yugoslav federation (overwhelmingly favoured among Serbs) or to seek independence (overwhelmingly favoured among Bosniaks and Croats).

Throughout 1990, the RAM Plan was developed by the State Security Administration (SDB or SDS) and a group of selected Serb officers of the Yugoslav People's Army (JNA) with the purpose of organizing Serbs outside Serbia, consolidating control of the fledgling SDP, and the prepositioning of arms and ammunition. The plan was meant to prepare the framework for a third Yugoslavia in which all Serbs with their territories would live together in the same state. Alarmed, the government of Bosnia and Herzegovina declared independence from Yugoslavia on 15 October 1991, shortly followed by the establishment of the Serbian National Assembly by Bosnian Serbs.

The Serb members of parliament, consisting mainly of Serb Democratic Party (SDP) members, abandoned the central parliament in Sarajevo, and formed the Assembly of the Serb People of Bosnia and Herzegovina on 24 October 1991, which marked the end of the tri-ethnic coalition that had governed after the 1990 elections. This Assembly established the Serbian Republic of Bosnia and Herzegovina on 9 January 1992, which became the Republika Srpska in August 1992.

The declaration of Bosnian sovereignty was followed by a referendum for independence on 29 February and 1 March 1992, which was boycotted by the vast majority of Serbs. The turnout in the referendum was 63.4% with 99.7% of voters choosing independence.

== Timeline ==
=== 1992 ===
==== Start of the war ====
Violence broke out in many places during and after the referendum. On 1 March, a gunman opened fire at a Bosnian Serb wedding procession in Baščaršija, Sarajevo's historical centre. The guests were carrying and waving Serbian flags, an act which the Bosniaks, who mostly supported independence, interpreted as a deliberate provocation. The groom's father was killed, and an Orthodox priest was wounded. Some of the witnesses identified the shooter as Ramiz Delalić, a Bosniak gangster who had become increasingly brazen since the collapse of communism. Arrest warrants were issued for him and another assailant, but little effort was made by the Sarajevo police to apprehend them. The killing was denounced by the SDS, who charged that the SDA or the government was complicit in the shooting, as evidenced by their failure to arrest the suspects. An SDS spokesman claimed the wedding attack was evidence of the mortal danger Serbs would be subject to in an independent Bosnia. This statement was rejected by the founder of the Patriotic League, Sefer Halilović, who stated that the procession was not a wedding but was in fact intended as a provocation.

On 2 March, Serb paramilitaries set up barricades and positioned snipers near Sarajevo's parliament building, but their coup d'état was thwarted by thousands of Sarajevo citizens who took to the streets and placed themselves in front of the snipers. Armed Bosniaks known as "Green Berets" also erected barricades in and around Sarajevo. More barricades appeared near Banja Luka, and a motorist was killed by armed Serbs in Doboj. By the end of the day, twelve people had been killed in the fighting. Following Bosnia and Herzegovina's official declaration of independence from Yugoslavia on 3 March 1992, sporadic fighting broke out between Serbs and government forces all across the territory. It continued through the run-up to Bosnia and Herzegovina's recognition as an independent state.

On 3 March, Bosnia's Bosniak President Alija Izetbegović claimed that Serbs from Pale were marching on Sarajevo. Fighting soon broke out in the town of Bosanski Brod. Eleven Serbs were killed in the village of Sijekovac outside of Brod on 26 March, and the SDS claimed they were massacred by a Croat-Bosniak militia. The town was besieged and shelled by the JNA and Serbian paramilitaries on 29 March. There were further clashes in Bijeljina, which was attacked by a Serb force led by Serb Volunteer Guard. On 4 April, as the information of the killings in Bijeljina came to light, the Bosnian government announced a general mobilisation call. The SDS responded that this call brought Sarajevo one step closer to war.

On 4 April 1992, when Izetbegović ordered all reservists and police in Sarajevo to mobilize, and the SDS called for evacuation of the city's Serbs, there came the "definite rupture between the Bosnian government and Serbs". The following day, ethnic Serb policemen attacked police stations and an Interior Ministry training school. The attack killed two officers and one civilian. The Presidency of Bosnia and Herzegovina declared a state of emergency the following day. Later that day, Serb paramilitaries in Sarajevo repeated their action of the previous month. A crowd of peace marchers, between 50,000 and 100,000 comprising all ethnic groups, rallied in protest. When a huge crowd approached a barricade, a demonstrator was killed by Serb forces. Six Serb snipers were arrested, but were exchanged when the Serbs threatened to kill the commandant of the Bosnian police academy arrested the previous day with the takeover of the academy.

Bosnia and Herzegovina received international recognition on 6 April 1992. The most common view is that the war started that day.

On 6 April, Serb forces began shelling Sarajevo, and in the next two days crossed the Drina from Serbia proper and besieged Bosniak-majority Zvornik, Višegrad and Foča. All of Bosnia was engulfed in war by mid-April. There were some efforts to halt violence. On 27 April, the Bosnian government ordered the JNA to be put under civilian control or expelled, which was followed by a series of conflicts in early May between the two. On 2 May, the Green Berets and local gang members fought back a disorganized Serb attack aimed at cutting Sarajevo in two. On 3 May, Izetbegović was kidnapped at Sarajevo Airport by JNA officers, and used to gain safe passage of JNA troops from downtown Sarajevo. However, Bosnian forces dishonoured the agreement and ambushed the departing JNA convoy, which embittered all sides. A ceasefire and agreement on evacuation of the JNA was signed on 18 May, while on 20 May the Bosnian presidency declared the JNA an occupation force.

The JNA attacked the Ministry of Training Academy in Vraca, the central tramway depot, and the Old Town district with mortars, artillery and tank fire. The Bosnian government had expected the international community to deploy a peacekeeping force following recognition, but it did not materialize in time to prevent war from breaking out across the country.

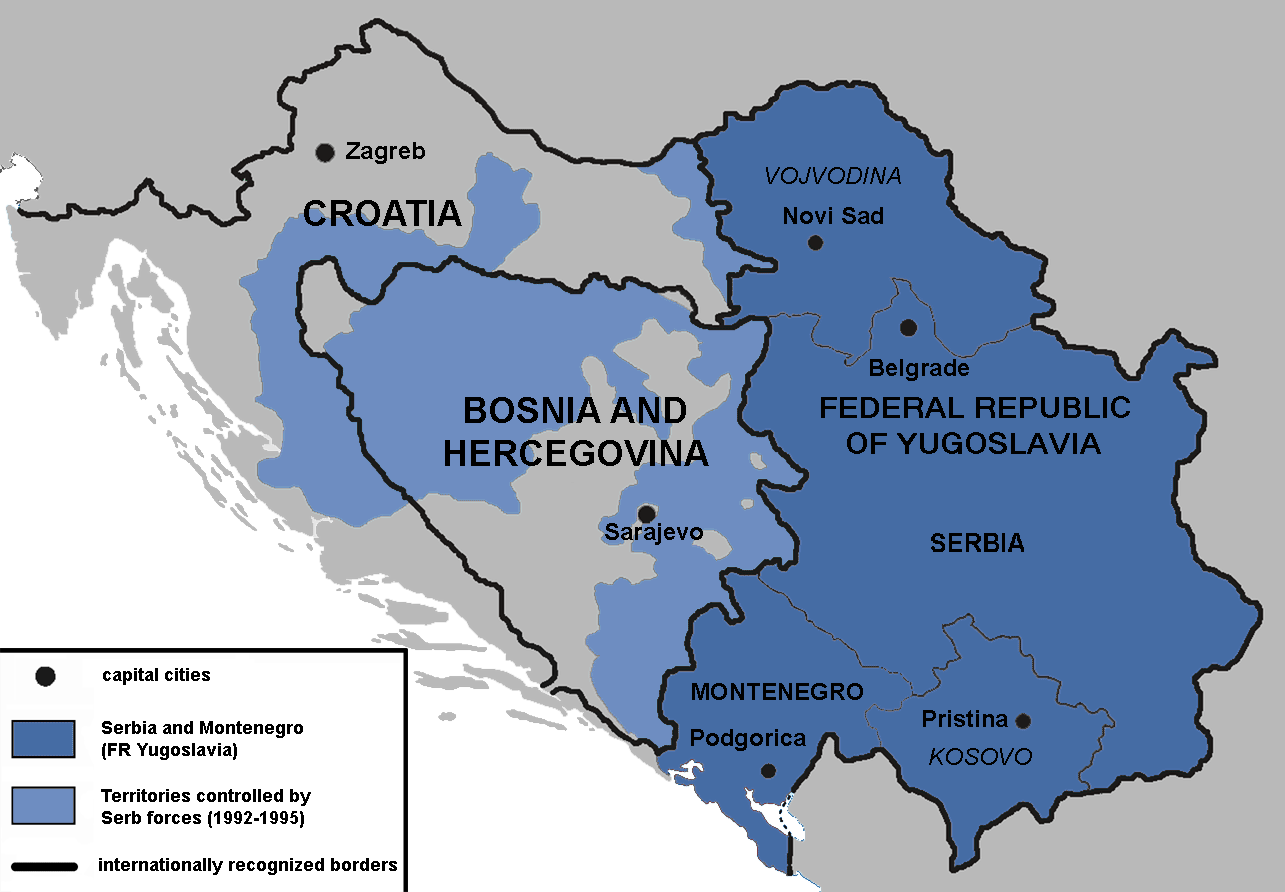
Territories controlled by Serb forces as of July 1992.

Bosnian Serb and JNA troops overwhelmed the poorly equipped and unprepared Bosnian security forces to take control of large areas of Bosnian territory, beginning with attacks on Bosniak civilians in the east. Serb military, police and paramilitary forces attacked towns and villages and then, sometimes assisted by local Serb residents, applied what soon became their standard operating procedure: Bosniak houses and apartments were systematically ransacked or burned; civilians were rounded up, some beaten or killed; and men were separated from the women. Many of the men were forcibly removed to prison camps. The women were incarcerated in detention centres in extremely unhygienic conditions and suffered numerous severe abuses. Many were repeatedly raped. Survivors testified that Serb soldiers and police would visit the detention centres, select one or more women, take them out and rape them.

On 22 April, a peace rally in front of the Republic Assembly building was broken up by shots that came from the nearby Holiday Inn. By the end of April, the form of the siege was largely established. The Serb-inhabited Sarajevan suburb of Ilidža saw heavy fighting between the local Serb forces on one side and various Bosniak forces on the other. The local Serbs soon formed the Ilidža Brigade, which became a part of the Sarajevo-Romanija Corps of the VRS.

==== Early fighting for control of the city ====
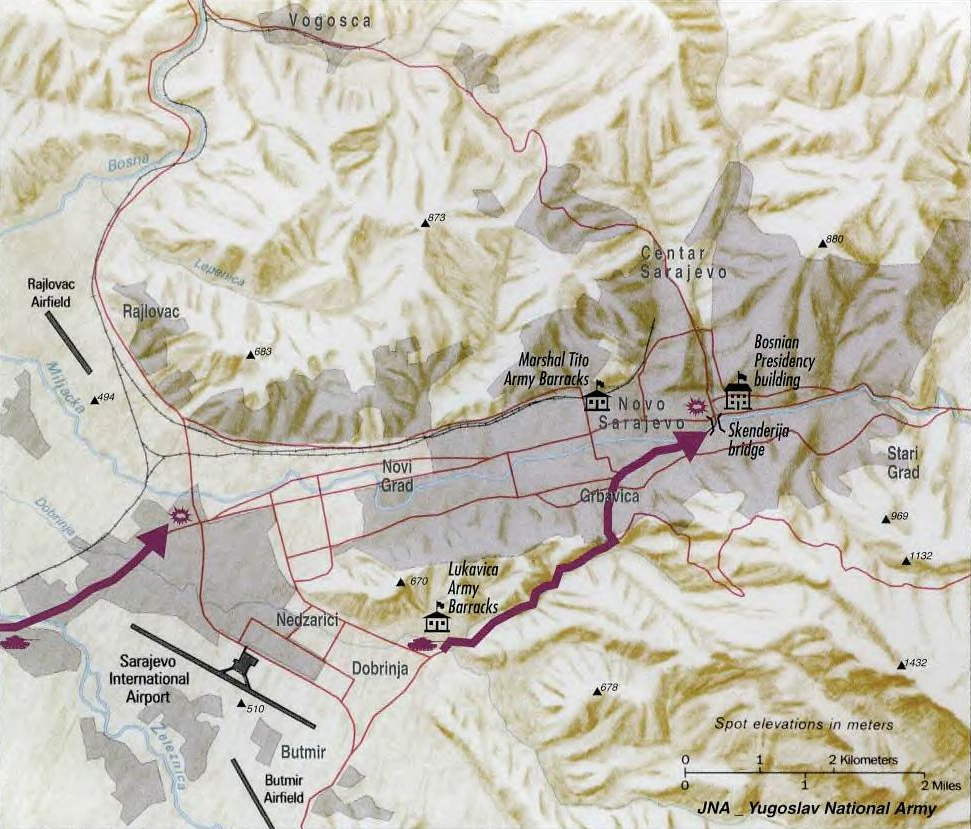
A CIA map of the JNA attack on 2 May 1992.

In the months leading up to the war, JNA forces in the region began to mobilize in the hills surrounding Sarajevo. Artillery, together with other ordnance and equipment that would prove key in the coming siege of the city, was deployed at this time. In April 1992, the Bosnian government under Izetbegović demanded that the Yugoslav government remove these forces. Slobodan Milošević, the president of Serbia, agreed only to withdraw individuals who originated from outside Bosnia's borders, an insignificant number. JNA soldiers who were ethnic Serbs from Bosnia were transferred to the Army of Republika Srpska (VRS) under the command of General Ratko Mladić, with the VRS having rescinded its allegiance to Bosnia a few days after Bosnia seceded from Yugoslavia.

On 5 April 1992, a unit of the Yugoslav Peoples Army (JNA) seized the airport of Sarajevo. It was under the direct control of Belgrade.

In May 1992, units of the JNA stationed in Sarajevo found themselves repeatedly under attack. On 2 May, Bosniak forces consisting of the Green Berets and the Patriotic League, opened fire on a column of eight JNA MEDEVAC vehicles in Vojvode Stepe street. This attack caused the JNA to retreat to Serb-held positions in Lukavica district.

On 2 May 1992, Bosnian Serb forces established a total blockade of the city. They blocked the major access roads, cutting supplies of food and medicine, and also cut off the city's utilities (e.g., water, electricity and heating). Although they possessed superior weaponry, they were greatly outnumbered by ARBiH soldiers who were defending the city. After numerous JNA armored columns failed to take the city, the Serbs began to concentrate their efforts on weakening it by using continual bombardment from at least 200 reinforced positions and bunkers in the surrounding hills.

Damaged government building in October 1996.

On 3 May 1992, members of the ARBiH attacked a convoy of withdrawing JNA soldiers on Dobrovoljačka Street in Sarajevo. The attack is thought to have been in retaliation for the arrest of Izetbegović, who was detained at Sarajevo Airport by Yugoslav police the previous day. The attack started with the convoy being separated when a car was driven into it. Then sporadic and disorganized fighting took place for several minutes in and around the convoy. 6–42 soldiers were killed in the incident. General Milutin Kukanjac, the commander of the JNA in Sarajevo, confirmed that just in Dobrovoljačka street alone four officers, one soldier and one civilian were killed in the attack. General Lewis MacKenzie, the UN peacekeeper in Sarajevo and who was in the convoy, described what he saw: "I could see the Territorial Defense soldiers push the rifles through the windows of civilians' cars, which were part of the convoy, and shoot [...] I saw blood flow down the windshields. It was definitely the worst day of my life." In the Documentary The Death of Yugoslavia Lewis MacKenzie described how the convoy split in half: "I believe a red Volkswagen took off and driven across the intersection and blocked and split the convoy in two." General Jovan Divijak, a commander for the ARBiH in Sarajevo, tried to stop the shooting and calm things down.

Shellings of Sarajevo on 24, 26, 28 and 29 May were attributed to Mladić by Boutros-Ghali. Civilian casualties of a 27 May shelling of the city led to Western intervention, in the form of sanctions imposed on 30 May through United Nations Security Council Resolution 757. That same day Bosnian forces attacked the JNA barracks in the city, which was followed by heavy shelling. On 5 and 6 June the last JNA personnel left the city during heavy street fighting and shelling. The 20 June cease-fire, executed to allow the UN takeover of Sarajevo Airport for humanitarian flights, was broken as both sides battled for control of the territory between the city and airport. The airport crisis led to Boutros-Ghali's ultimatum on 26 June, that the Serbs stop attacks on the city, allow the UN to take control of the airport, and place their heavy weapons under UN supervision. Meanwhile, media reported that President George H. W. Bush considered the use of force in Bosnia. French President François Mitterrand visited Sarajevo on 28–29 June. Undramatically, the Serbs handed over the airport to UNPROFOR on 29 June. World public opinion was 'decisively and permanently against the Serbs' following media reports on the sniping and shelling.

From 25 to 26 August, under command of Colonel Tomislav Šipčić, the Sarajevo City Hall was burned down by cannon fire from Serb positions.

On 30 August 1992, an artillery shell crashed into a crowded marketplace on the western edge of Sarajevo. The resulting explosion killed 15 people and wounded 100 others.

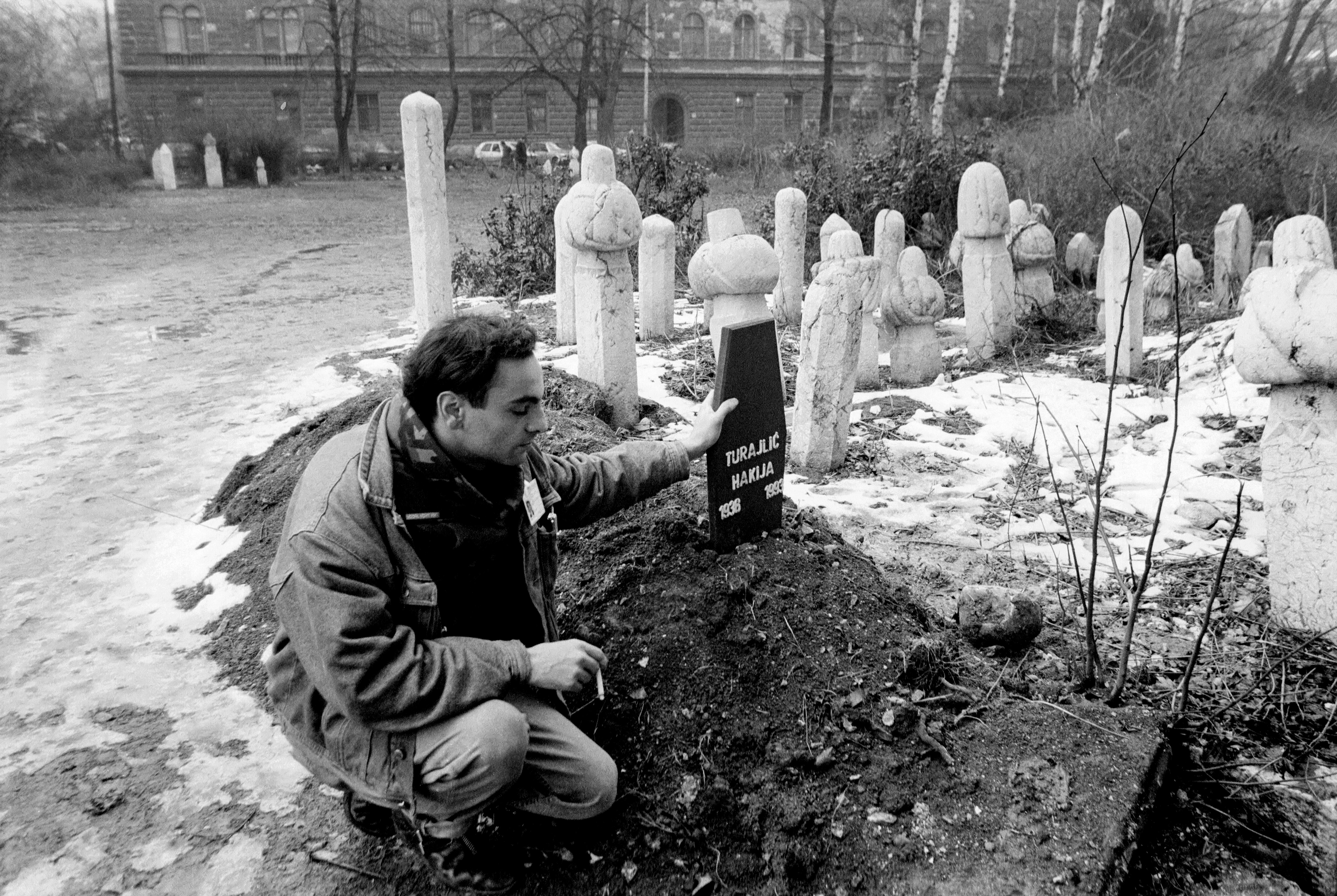
Dutch reporter Robert Dulmers at Hakija Turajlić's graveside, Ali Pasha Mosque, March 1993.

=== 1993 ===
On 8 January 1993, Hakija Turajlić, the Deputy Prime Minister of Bosnia and Herzegovina, was assassinated by a Bosnian Serb soldier. Turajlić, who had gone to Sarajevo Airport to greet a Turkish delegation, was returning to the city in a United Nations armored vehicle that had taken him there when a force of two tanks and 40–50 Bosnian Serb soldiers blockaded the road. The Serbs, acting on radioed information from a Serbian military liaison officer at the airport that "Turkish fighters" were on their way to reinforce the Bosnian defenders, accused the three French soldiers manning the armored vehicle of transporting "Turkish mujahedeen". After a Serbian military liaison officer identified the passenger as Turajlić, the Serbs ordered the UN soldiers to hand him over. The rear door was opened, and one of the Serbs fired seven shots at Turajlić from an automatic weapon. Six bullets struck him in the chest and arms, killing him instantly. A Bosnian Serb soldier, Goran Vasić, was eventually charged with Turajlić's murder but was ultimately acquitted of that charge in 2002.

On 6 May 1993, the United Nations Security Council Resolution 824 declared that Sarajevo be a UN Safe Area (along with Žepa, Goražde, Tuzla, and Bihać). These cities and territories were placed under the protection of UNPROFOR peacekeeping units.

=== 1994 ===
==== Markale massacres ====
On 5 February 1994 at 12:10–12:15, a 120-millimeter mortar shell landed in the center of the crowded marketplace and killed 68 and injured 144. The perpetrators were deemed by the ICTY to likely be the Army of Republika Srpska. In December 2003, the ICTY convicted Bosnian Serb General Stanislav Galić and concluded that the Serb forces around Sarajevo committed the massacre.

In February 1994 (when air strikes were originally threatened), NATO had created a heavy weapons exclusion zone around Sarajevo, and collected weapons at a number of sites. On 5 August, the VRS seized several weapons from the Illidža Weapons Collection site in clear violation of the exclusion zone agreement. During the seizure, Serb forces injured a Ukrainian UNPROFOR peacekeeper. In response to the attack, the UN once again requested NATO air support. Two U.S. A-10 aircraft repeatedly strafed Serb targets, and the Serbs returned the seized weapons to the collection site.

On 22 September, UNPROFOR again requested NATO air support in the Sarajevo area after Serb forces attacked a French armored personnel carrier. In response, two British SEPECAT Jaguar aircraft struck near a Serb tank, destroying it.

On 14 December 1994, a concert of Bruce Dickinson's solo band Skunkworks, organised by the UN, took place inside the city.

=== 1995 ===
From 15 to 22 June, the ARBiH would launch an offensive into the Sarajevo Region to try to recapture lost territories from the Serbs. In the north, the 16th Division/1st Corps attacked Cemerska Hills and recaptured it. The Serbs would attack and capture Cemerska hills from the ARBiH. From the center, the 12th Division/1st Corps attacked Serb position of Debelo Brdo. In the south, the 14 Division/1st managed to push the Serbs back to Route Viper and captured the most land from the offensive.

On 28 August 1995 at around 11:00 (Central European Time), five shells were fired onto the Markale Market, causing the 2nd Markale massacre. Casualties were fewer however, 43 died and 73 were wounded. But just several hours prior to the attack, Bosnian Serb authorities tentatively expressed their will to accept Richard Holbrooke's peace plan. Again the perpetrator was the VRS.

== Humanitarian airlift ==
UNPROFOR launched its humanitarian airlift operations, providing Sarajevo with much-needed supplies from mid-1992 to the beginning of 1995. More than 13,000 flights were made over the course of more than three years. It was the most airlifts to a capital city since the Berlin airlifts.

While capitalizing on the fact that the airport was under the control of UNPROFOR, defenders of Sarajevo began digging a tunnel beneath the runway that ran between the Sarajevo neighborhoods of Dobrinja and Butmir. It was known as the "Sarajevo Tunnel". It became the only land link besieged Sarajevo had with the rest of the world. Several hundred people died while running across the airstrip, which was the only way in or out of besieged Sarajevo before the Sarajevo Tunnel was dug.

== Atrocities ==
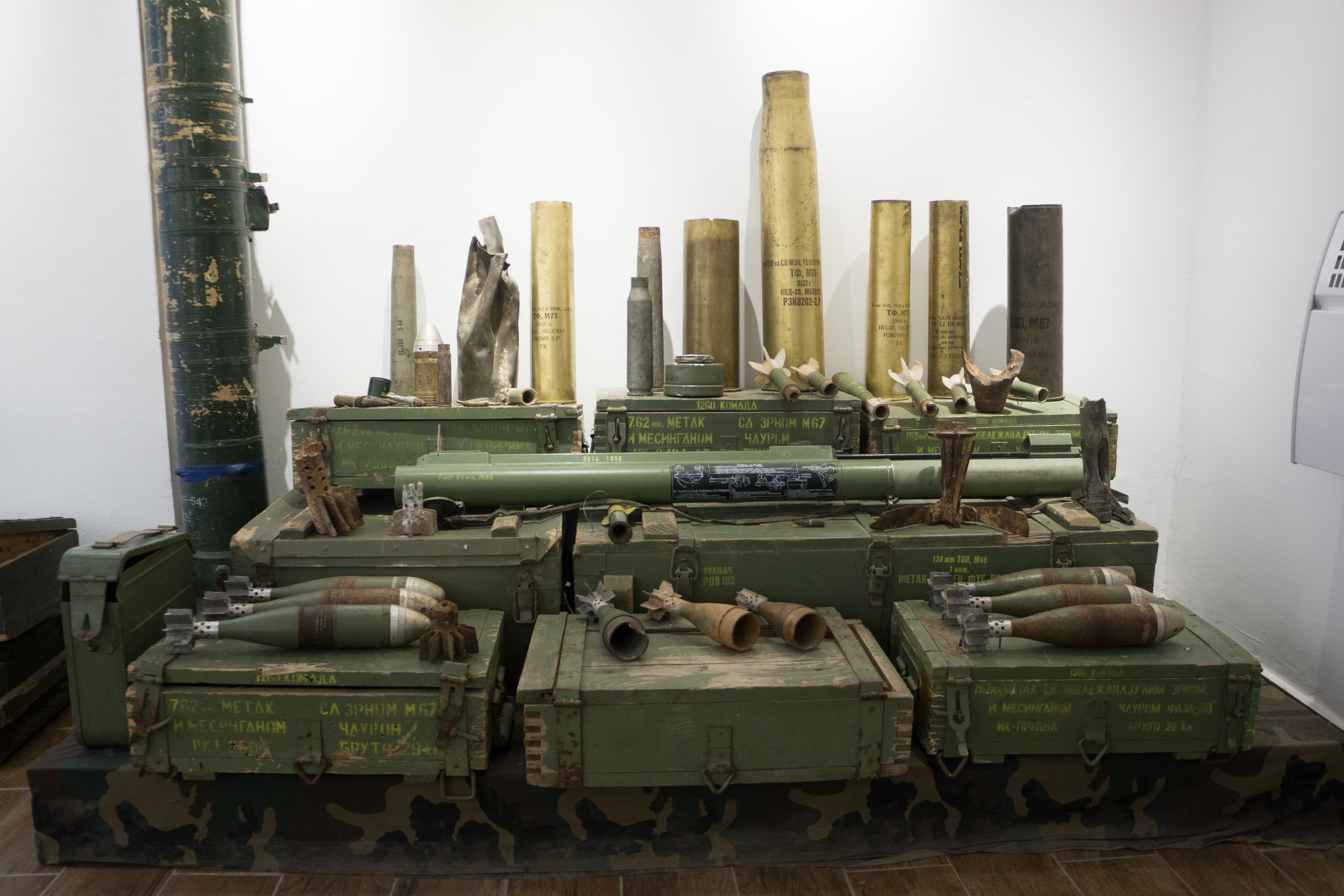
Examples of weapons used against Sarajevans displayed at Sarajevo Tunnel Museum.

The second half of 1992 and the first half of 1993 were the height of the siege of Sarajevo, and atrocities were committed during heavy fighting. Serb forces outside the city continuously shelled the government defenders. Inside the city, the Serbs controlled most of the major military positions and the supply of arms. With snipers taking up positions in the city, signs reading Pazite, Snajper! ("Beware, Sniper!") became commonplace and certain particularly dangerous streets, most notably Ulica Zmaja od Bosne, the main street which eventually leads to the airport, were known as "sniper alleys". The sniper killings of Admira Ismić and Boško Brkić, a mixed Bosnian-Serbian couple who tried to cross the lines, became a symbol of the suffering in the city and the basis of Romeo and Juliet in Sarajevo, but it is unknown from which side the snipers opened fire.

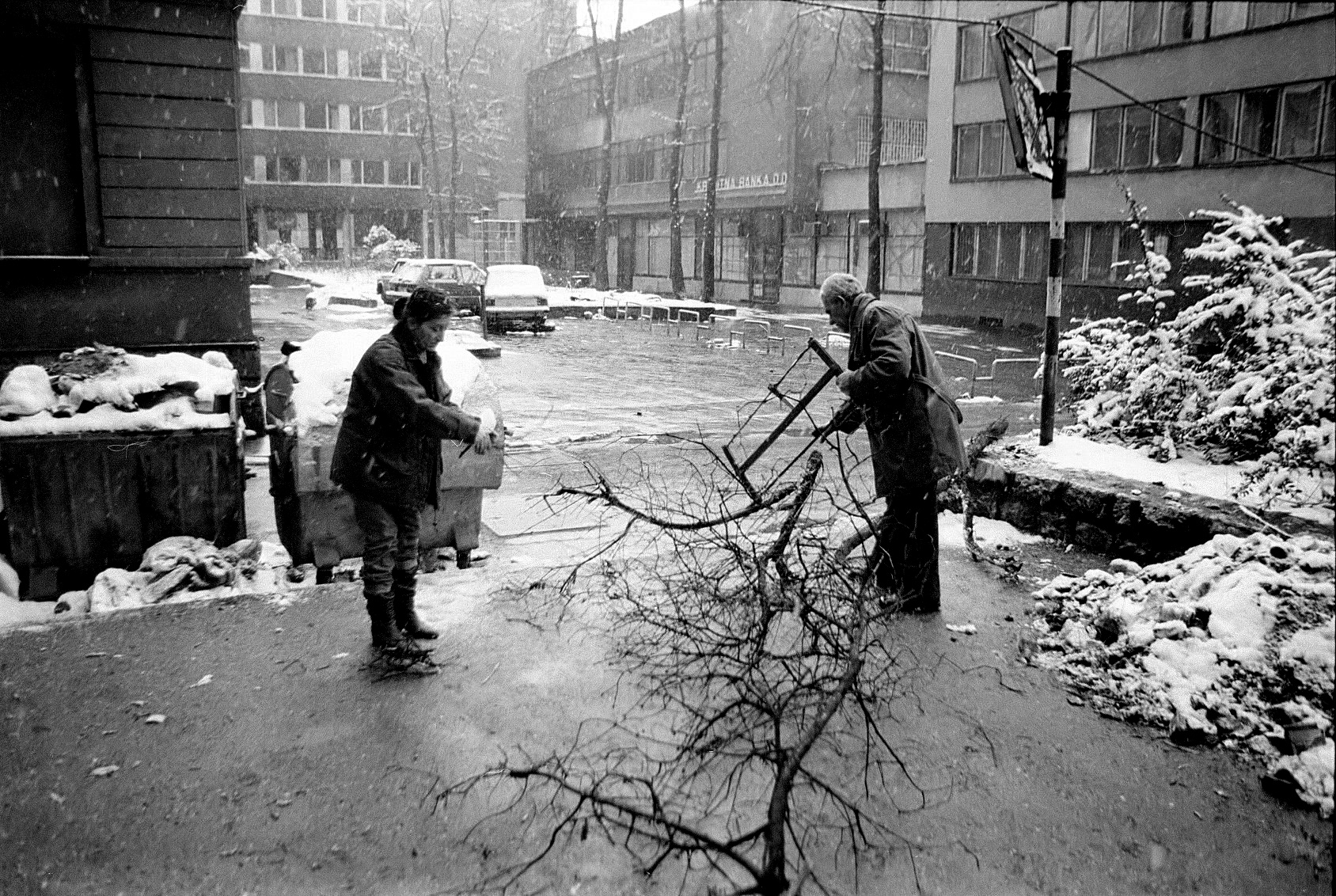
Sarajevo residents collecting firewood, winter of 1992–1993.

Within Bosniak-held areas of Sarajevo, public services quickly collapsed and the crime rate skyrocketed. During the first year of the siege, the 10th Mountain Division of the ARBiH, led by a rogue commander, Mušan Topalović, engaged in a campaign of mass executions of Serb civilians who still lived within the Bosniak-held areas. Many of the victims were transported to the Kazani pit near Sarajevo, where they were executed and buried in a mass grave.

Bosnian Serb offensives were mounted to take over some neighbourhoods, especially in Novo Sarajevo. Compared with the siege force, the Bosnian government forces were very poorly armed. Bosnian black market criminals who joined the army at the outset of the war illegally smuggled arms into the city through Serb lines, and raids on Serb-held positions within the city yielded more.

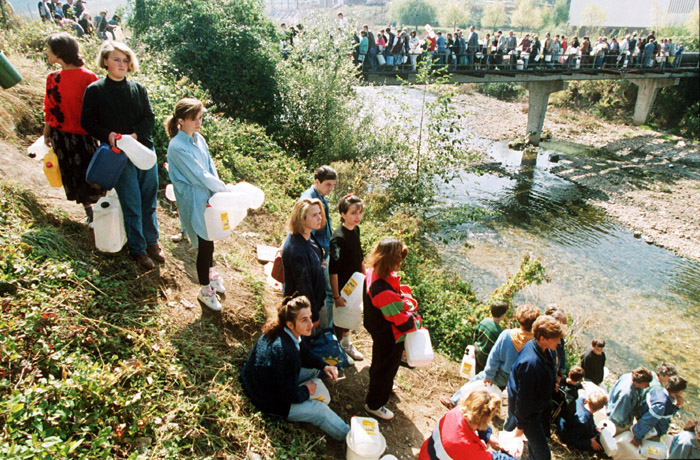
Citizens of Sarajevo in line for water, 1992.

Reports indicated an average of approximately 329 shell impacts per day during the course of the siege, with a maximum of 3,777 on 22 July 1993. This urbicide by shellfire extensively damaged the city's structures, both residential and cultural. By September 1993 it was estimated that virtually all the buildings in Sarajevo had suffered some degree of damage, and 35,000 were completely destroyed. Among buildings targeted and destroyed were hospitals and medical complexes, media and communication centres, industrial complexes, government buildings and military and UN facilities. Other significant buildings damaged or destroyed included the Parliament buildings and the City Hall/National Library, which was set on fire and burned to the ground, destroying over 1,500,000 volumes and 600,000 serials.

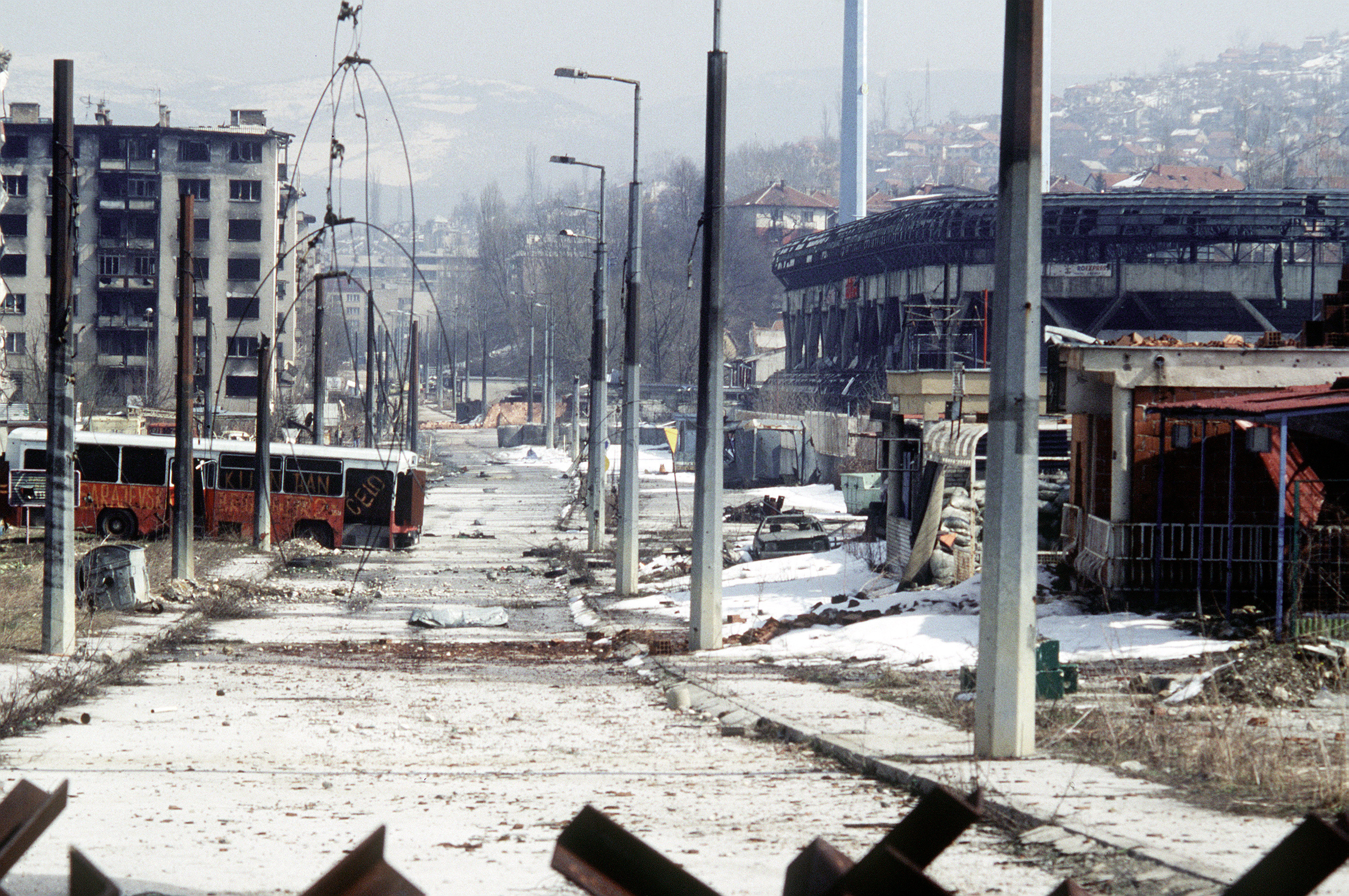
Overall view of downtown Grbavica, a suburb of Sarajevo. March 1996.

The shelling took a heavy toll on residents. Mass killings of civilians, primarily by mortar attacks, made headline news in the West. On 1 June 1993, 11 people were killed and 133 were wounded in an attack on a football game. On 12 July, twelve people were killed while waiting in line for water.

The biggest single loss of life was the first Markale marketplace massacre on 5 February 1994, in which 68 civilians were killed and 200 were wounded. Medical facilities were overwhelmed by the scale of the civilian casualties, and only a small number of the wounded benefited from medical evacuation programmes like 1993's Operation Irma.

=== Sarajevo Safari ===
Sarajevo Safari is the name for an alleged "war tourism" phenomenon that took place during the siege on the city. According to allegations and testimonies, wealthy foreign nationals were enabled, for large monetary fees, to shoot at civilians in the besieged city with sniper rifles. These activities allegedly took place from established positions of the Army of Republika Srpska (VRS) in the hills surrounding Sarajevo. This event became globally known following the AJB DOC Film Festival in Sarajevo in September 2022.

This received renewed attention in 2025 after the public prosecutor's office in Milan opened an investigation regarding Italian citizens that took part in such activities. The investigation includes testimony of a Bosnian military intelligence officer, that is being examined by an Italian counterterrorism prosecutor. The charge is murder. The group of "sniper tourists", including Italians and other nationalities, are alleged to have paid soldiers belonging to Radovan Karadžić's army to be escorted to the hills around Sarajevo to entertain themselves by sniping civilians.

== NATO's intervention ==
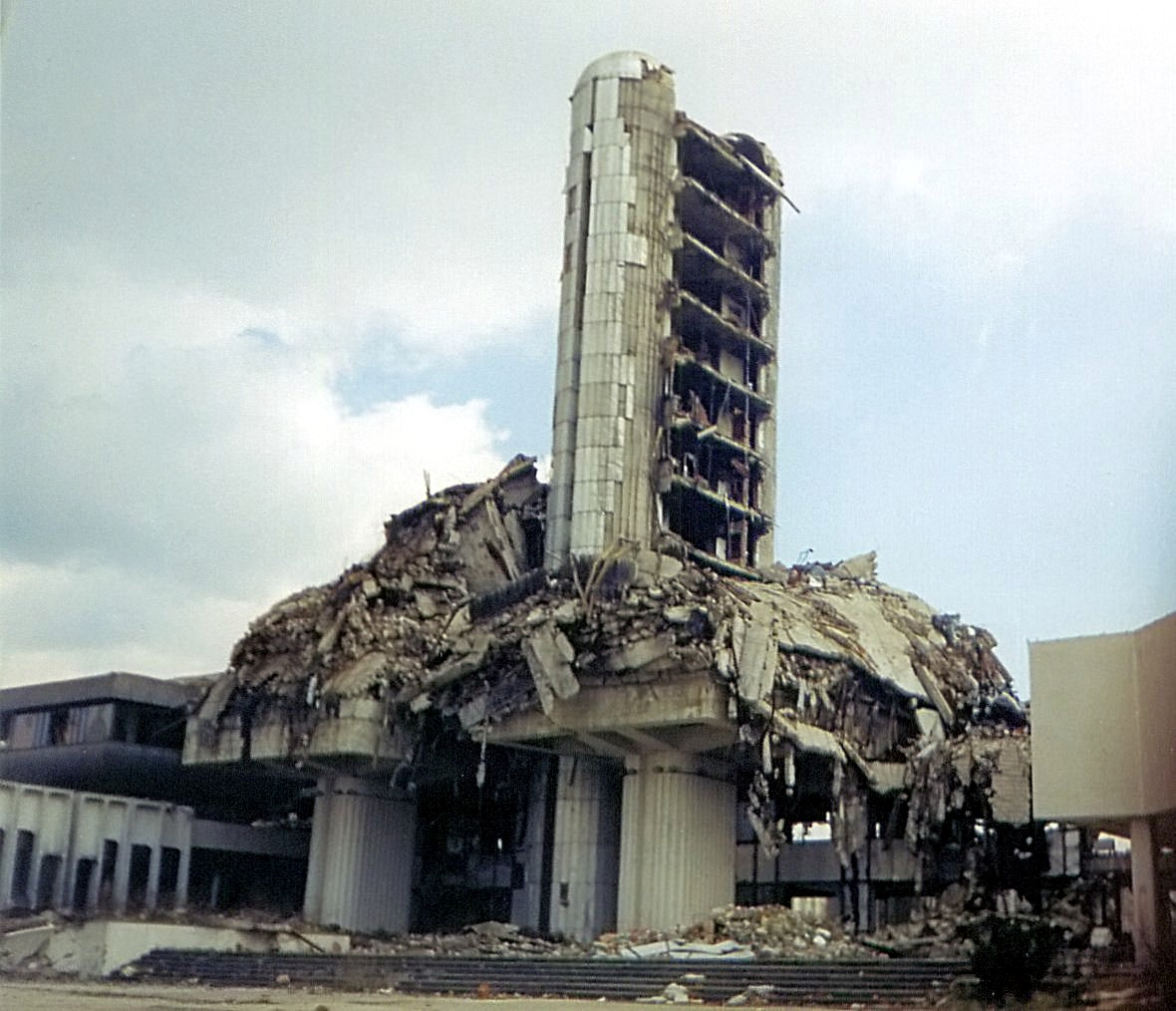
The remains of the building of Sarajevo newspaper Oslobođenje, kept as a memorial for several years after the siege.

On 6 February 1994, a day after the first Markale marketplace massacre, UN Secretary-General Boutros-Ghali formally requested NATO's confirmation that air strikes would be carried out immediately. On 9 February 1994, agreeing to the request of the UN, the North Atlantic Council of NATO authorized the Commander of Allied Forces Southern Europe (CINCSOUTH), U.S. Admiral Jeremy Boorda, to launch air strikes against artillery and mortar positions in and around Sarajevo that were determined by UNPROFOR to be responsible for attacks against civilian targets. Only Greece failed to support the use of airstrikes, but did not veto the proposal. The council also issued an ultimatum at the 9 February meeting to the Bosnian Serbs demanding that they remove heavy weapons around Sarajevo by midnight of 20–21 February or face air strikes. There was some confusion surrounding compliance with the ultimatum, and Hungarian Prime Minister Péter Boross announced that his country's air space would be closed to NATO aircraft in the event of airstrikes. On 12 February 1994, Sarajevo enjoyed its first casualty-free day in 22 months (since April 1992).

As many as 400 NATO aircraft participated in the air campaign.

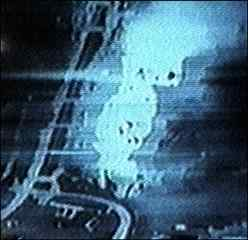
A Bosnian Serb target is hit by U.S. aircraft, 1995.

On 5 August, the VRS seized several weapons from the Illidža Weapons Collection site in clear violation of the exclusion zone agreement. During the seizure, the Serbs injured a Ukrainian UNPROFOR peacekeeper. In response to the attack, the UN once again requested NATO air support. Two U.S. A-10 aircraft repeatedly strafed Serb targets, prompting the Serbs to return the seized weapons to the collection site. On 22 September, UNPROFOR again requested NATO air support in the Sarajevo area after Serb forces attacked a French armored personnel carrier. In response, two British Jaguar aircraft struck and destroyed a Serb tank.

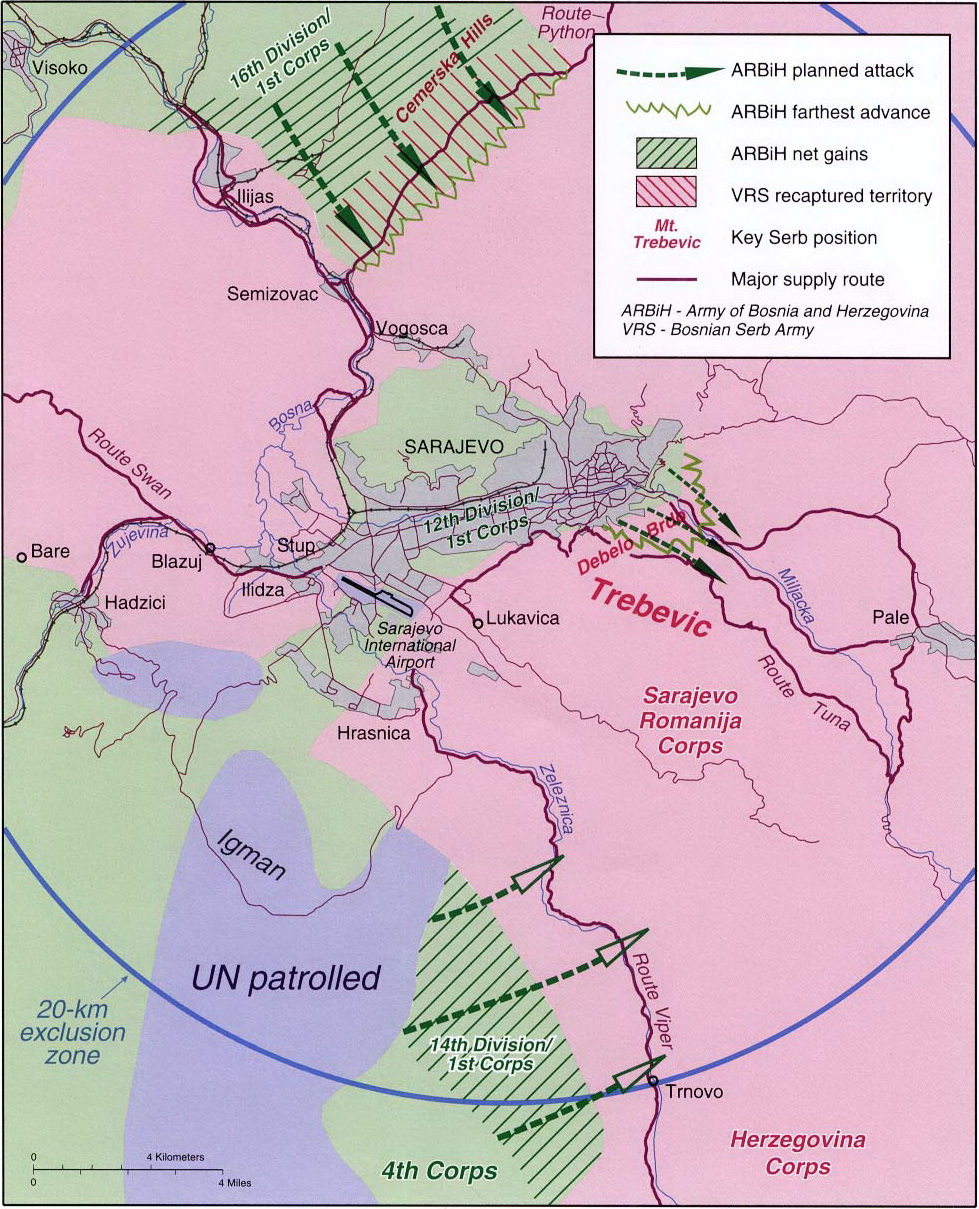
Bosnian Army Offensive Operations in the Sarajevo Region, 15–22 June 1995.

As the fighting gradually widened in 1995, Bosnian Muslim forces launched a large-scale offensive in the area of Sarajevo. In response to the attack, the Bosnian Serbs seized heavy weapons from a UN-guarded depot, and began shelling targets. As a retaliation for these actions, the UN commander, Lt. General Rupert Smith, requested NATO air strikes. NATO honored the request on 25 May and 26 May 1995 by bombing a Serb ammunition dump near Pale. The mission was carried out by USAF F-16s and Spanish Air Force EF-18A Hornets armed with laser-guided bombs. The Serbs then seized 377 UNPROFOR hostages and used them as human shields for a variety of targets in Bosnia, forcing NATO to end its strikes.

On 27 May 1995, Serb soldiers posing as French troops captured two UN observation posts at either end of the front-line Vrbanja bridge without firing a shot. They wore French uniforms, flak jackets and helmets, were armed with French weapons and drove a French armoured personnel carrier – all stolen from UN troops detained outside the city. The soldiers disarmed the 12 peacekeepers at gunpoint. Ten were taken to an unknown destination while two remained on the bridge as human shields. The French responded by sending 30 troops, backed by six light tanks, to storm the northern end of the bridge. Two French soldiers were killed in the clash and five were wounded, while four Serb soldiers were killed and four were taken prisoner. At the end of the day, the Serbs remained in control of the southern portion of the bridge, while the French occupied the northern portion. The Serbs later abandoned the southern portion of the bridge.

In 1995, the international forces firmly turned against the besiegers after the second Markale massacre of 28 August. On 30 August, the Secretary General of NATO announced the start of air strikes, supported by UNPROFOR rapid reaction force artillery attacks. On that same day, a French Mirage 2000 was downed by a Bosnian Serb shoulder-fired SAM near Pale.

On 1 September, NATO and the UN demanded the lifting of the siege, removal of heavy weapons from the heavy weapons exclusion zone around Sarajevo, and complete security of other UN safe areas. The Bosnian Serb leaders were given a deadline of 4 September, and the Operation Deliberate Force bombing campaign was suspended. Heavy weapons had not been removed when the deadline passed. On 5 September, air strikes resumed on Bosnian Serb positions around Sarajevo and near the Bosnian Serb headquarters at Pale.

On 14 September, they were again suspended, this time to allow the implementation of an agreement with the Bosnian Serbs which included the withdrawal of heavy weapons from the exclusion zone. Finally, on 20 September 1995, French General Bernard Janvier (Commander of UNPROFOR) and U.S. Admiral Leighton W. Smith Jr. (CINCSOUTH) agreed that it was not necessary to resume the strikes as the Bosnian Serbs had complied with the UN's conditions. Operation Deliberate Force was terminated.

== Lifting of the siege ==
Fighting escalated on the ground as joint Bosnian and Croatian forces went on the offensive with Operations Mistral 2, Sana and Southern Move in September–October 1995. The Serbs were slowly driven back in Sarajevo and elsewhere, which eventually allowed the city's heating, electricity and water supplies to be restored. A ceasefire was reached in October 1995. On 14 December, the Dayton Agreement brought peace to the country and led to stabilization.

One of the last acts of hostility of the siege occurred at around 6 pm on 9 January 1996, when a single rocket-propelled grenade was fired at a tram running down the main street of Sarajevo, killing a 55-year-old woman, Mirsada Durić, and wounding 19 others. The grenade was fired from the neighbourhood of Grbavica, which was held by the Serbs at the time. After the attack, French troops from the Implementation Force (IFOR) searched the building from which the grenade was launched but did not capture the perpetrator(s).

The Bosnian government officially declared an end to the siege of Sarajevo on 29 February 1996, when Bosnian Serb forces left positions in and around the city. More than 70,000 Sarajevan Serbs subsequently left the Muslim-controlled districts of the city and moved to the Republika Srpska, taking all of their belongings with them.

== Aftermath ==
=== Casualties ===
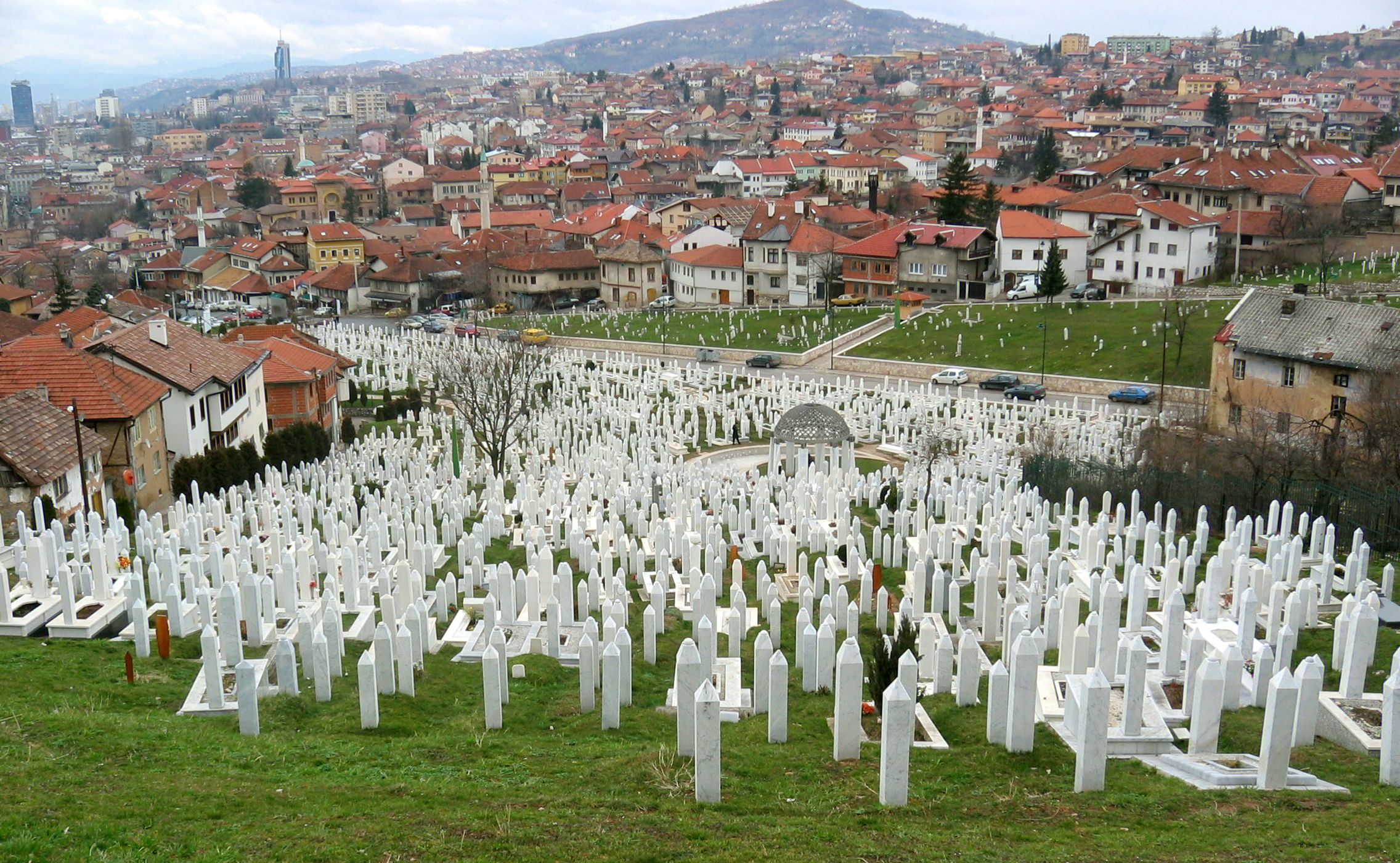
The Martyrs' Memorial Cemetery Kovači for victims of the war in Stari Grad.

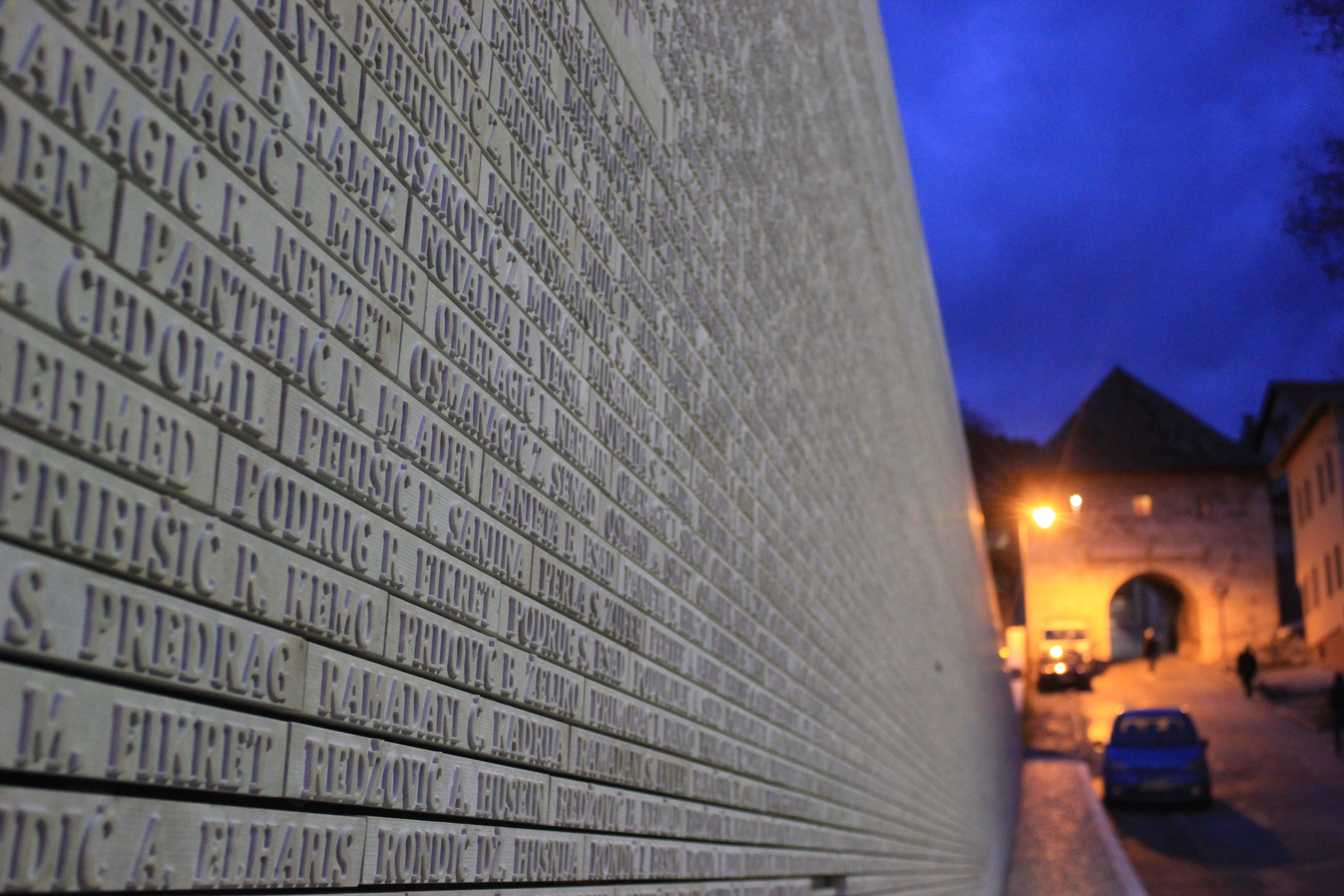
Names of all victims on a wall next to Kovači Cemetery.

The besieged population comprised not only Bosniaks and Croats, but also Serbs that had remained in the town and who were killed by fire from the besieging VRS forces. The 1991 census indicates that before the siege the city and its surrounding areas had a population of 525,980. There are estimates that prior to the siege the population in the city proper was 435,000. Estimates of the current population range between 300,000 and 380,000. In 1994, a report filed on the total number of deaths over a span of 315 days concluded that 2,474 people died, with an average of approximately eight killed in the city per day. A report on the total number of wounded over a span of 306 days concluded that 13,472 were wounded, an average of approximately 44 per day. This same report estimated the number of people killed or missing in the city to be nearly 10,000, including over 1,500 children. An additional 56,000 people were wounded, including nearly 15,000 children. A report produced by the ICTY after the war put the death toll of the siege at 4,548 ARBiH soldiers and 4,954 Sarajevan civilians killed. The Research and Documentation Center in Sarajevo (RDC) found that the siege left a total of 13,952 people dead: 9,429 Bosniaks, 3,573 Serbs, 810 Croats and 140 others. Of these, 6,137 were ARBiH soldiers and 2,241 were soldiers fighting either for the JNA or the VRS. On the other hand, according to historian Smail Čekić, the ARBiH suffered 3,587 casualties within the besieged city of Sarajevo, with 1,114 soldiers being killed in 1992 alone. The RDC estimates that a total of 5,434 civilians were killed during the siege, including 3,855 Bosniaks, 1,097 Serbs and 482 Croats. More than 66 percent of those killed during the siege were Bosniaks, 25.6 percent were Serbs, 5.8 percent were Croats and 1 percent were others. About 14.5 percent of all Bosnian War fatalities occurred in besieged Sarajevo. Officials of the Federation of Bosnia-Herzegovina have estimated that at least 150 Sarajevan Serb civilians were killed by government forces, while some nationalistic groups among Serbs and Republika Srpska officials have put the number at "many thousands". However, efforts to substantiate Bosnian Serb claims have been unconvincing.

UNICEF reported that of the estimated 65,000 to 80,000 children in the city, at least 40% had been directly shot at by snipers; 51% had seen someone killed; 39% had seen one or more family members killed; 19% had witnessed a massacre; 48% had their home occupied by someone else; 73% had their home attacked or shelled; and 89% had lived in underground shelters. It is probable that the psychological trauma suffered during the siege will bear heavily on the lives of these children in the years to come. As a result of the high number of casualties and the wartime conditions, there are makeshift cemeteries throughout Sarajevo and its surrounding areas. Parks, athletic fields and other open spaces were utilized as graveyards. One such site is the sports complex built for the 1984 Winter Olympics. A 1994 report stated that "the siege has also had a profound effect on the psyche and future of the city's population. The Bosnian Government has reported a soaring suicide rate by Sarajevans, a near doubling of abortions and a 50% drop in births since the siege began."

A memorial with the names of 521 children killed during the siege was unveiled on 9 May 2010. The cases of another 500 children are being verified.

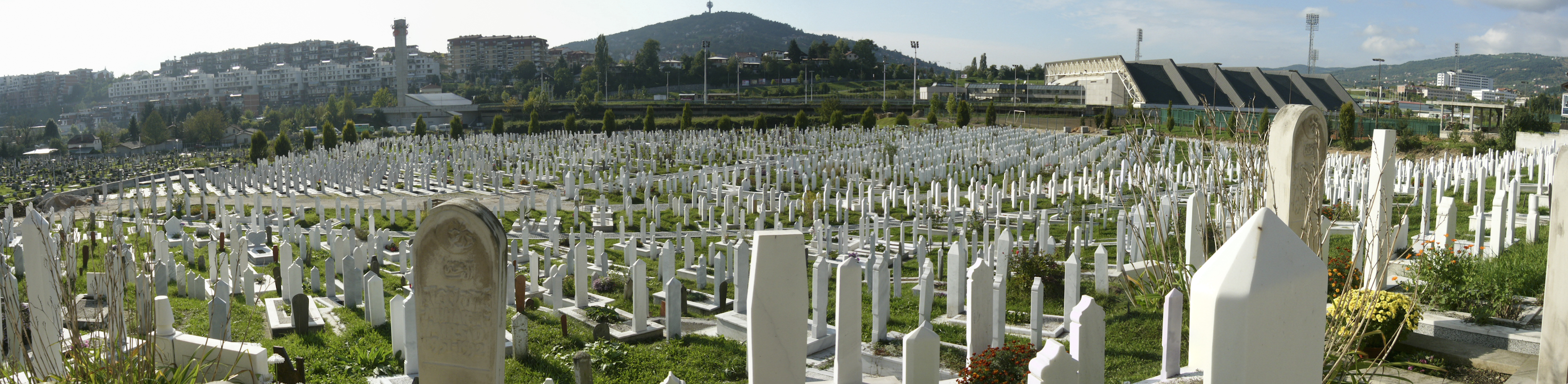
Mezarje Stadion Cemetery, Patriotske lige, Sarajevo.

=== Structural and property damage and destruction ===
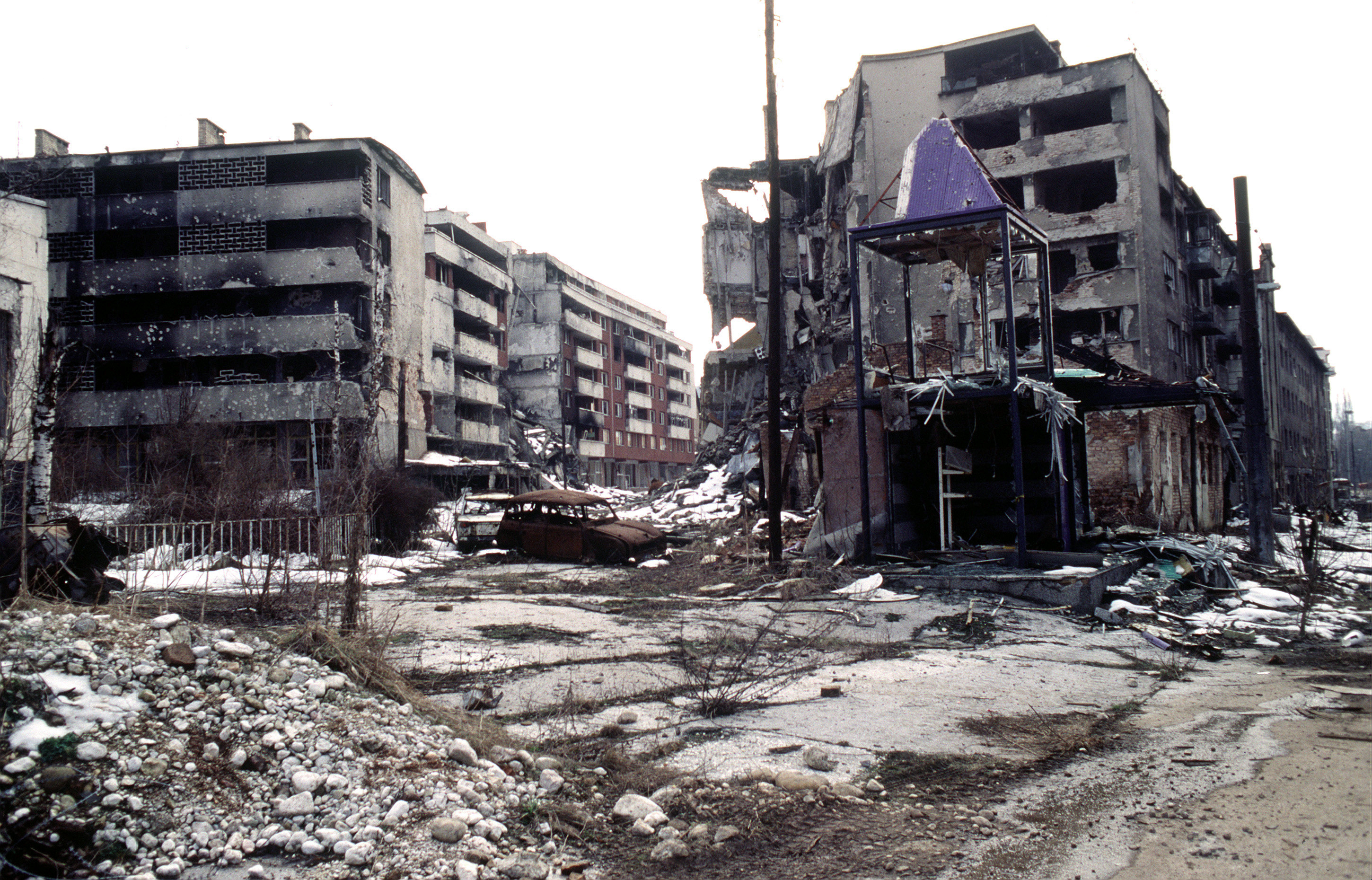
Heavily damaged apartment buildings near Vrbanja bridge in the Grbavica district on the left bank of the Miljacka river, on Zagrebačka street, 9th March 1996.

The structural and property damage in Sarajevo as a result of the siege included specifically protected targets such as hospitals and medical complexes, medical facilities (including ambulances) and medical personnel, as well as cultural property, such as the manuscript collection of the Oriental Institute in Sarajevo, one of the richest collections of Oriental manuscripts in the world. For foreigners, an event that defined the besiegers' cultural objectives occurred during the night of 25 August 1992. This was the bombardment – with incendiary shells – that resulted in the total destruction of the irreplaceable National and University Library of Bosnia and Herzegovina, the central repository of Bosnian written culture and a major cultural center for all the Balkans. Among the losses were about 700 manuscripts and incunabula, and a unique collection of Bosnian serial publications, some from the middle of the 19th-century Bosnian cultural revival. Libraries all over the world cooperated afterwards to restore some of the lost heritage, through donations and e-texts, rebuilding the Library in cyberspace.

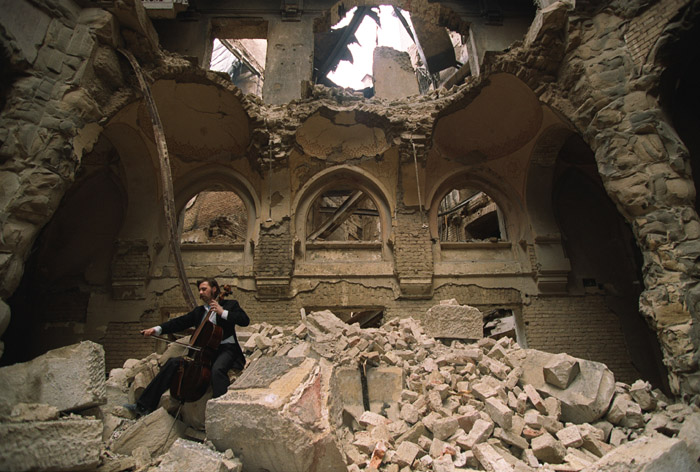
Vedran Smailović playing in the partially destroyed National Library in Sarajevo in 1992.

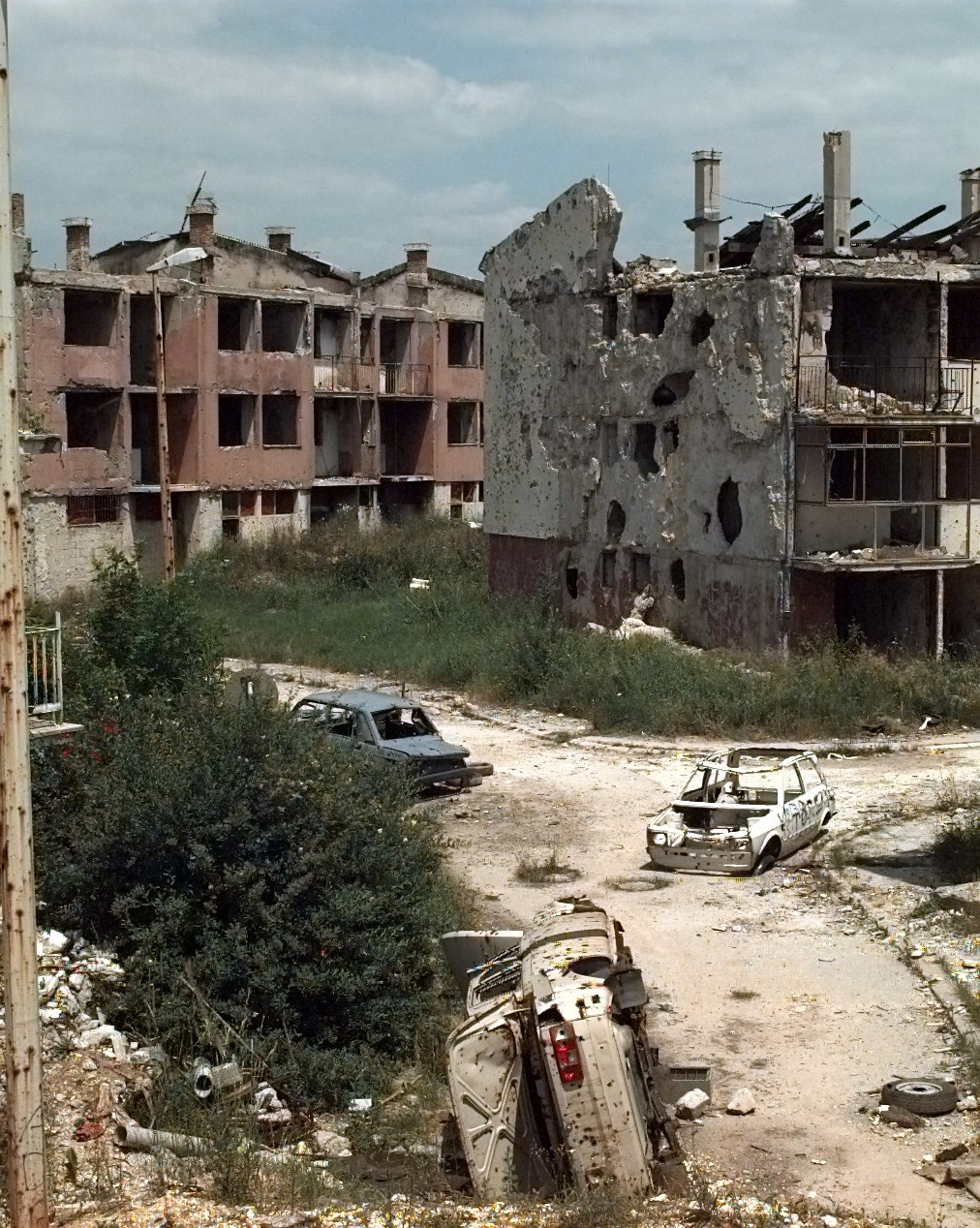
Destruction in Sarajevo's Dobrinja district photographed after the siege in 1996.

Also unjustified by any military necessity, and equally prohibited, were the attacks on civilian property. The Bosnian government estimated that shelling destroyed over 10,000 apartments and damaged over 100,000 others. Of the other buildings in the city, 23% were reported as seriously damaged, 64% as partially damaged and 10% as slightly damaged. In its report, the Council of Europe's Committee on Culture and Education commented on the structural damage in the city. The Committee stated:

It is plain that Sarajevo has suffered badly at the hands of its attackers. Apart from the obvious human cost in the continued suffering and difficulties of day to day living, there has been serious damage to the urban fabric. The infrastructure (drainage, electricity, telephone services, etc.) is badly damaged. Most buildings are damaged significantly and probably all buildings are damaged to a greater or lesser degree (broken glass etc.). Some buildings have been completely destroyed including ancient monuments (such as the Library) and including a number of modern steel framed buildings (such as the Unis Building) which in some cases have simply collapsed. 35,000 dwellings are also assessed to have been destroyed during the past year.

Sarajevo has made a substantial recovery in terms of the number of buildings that have been fully restored and reoccupied. However, as of 2017, many buildings remained heavily damaged and scarred.

Although the city had been a model for inter-ethnic relations, the siege brought dramatic population shifts. In addition to the thousands of refugees who left the city, many Sarajevo Serbs left for the Republika Srpska, and the percentage of Serbs in Sarajevo decreased from more than 30% in 1991 to slightly over 10% in 2002. Regions of Novo Sarajevo that are now part of the Republika Srpska have formed East Sarajevo, where much of the pre-war Serbian population lives today.

New construction projects and foreign capital investment have made Sarajevo perhaps the fastest-growing city in the former Yugoslavia. The population grew to 401,000 in 2002, which is 20,000 fewer than the pre-1991 census estimate.

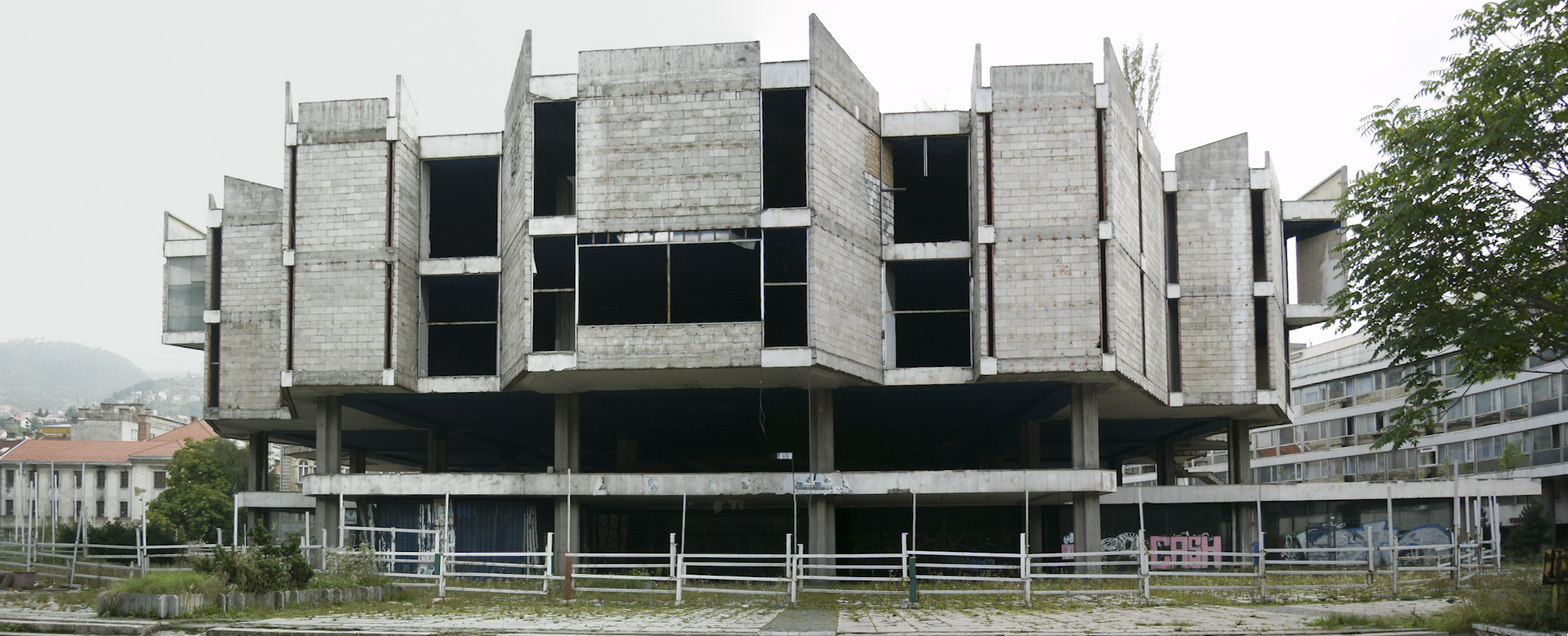
An iconic building before the war was Robna kuća Sarajka (photographed in 2005). Today ARIA Centar stands in its place.

== Convictions by the ICTY ==
On 5 December 2003, the International Criminal Tribunal for the former Yugoslavia (ICTY) convicted the first commander of the Sarajevo-Romanija Corps, General Stanislav Galić, of the shelling and sniper terror campaign against Sarajevo, including the first Markale massacre. Galić was sentenced to life imprisonment for the crimes against humanity during the siege.

In the case against Galić, the prosecution alleged in an opening statement that:

The siege of Sarajevo, as it came to be popularly known, was an episode of such notoriety in the conflict in the former Yugoslavia that one must go back to World War II to find a parallel in European history. Not since then had a professional army conducted a campaign of unrelenting violence against the inhabitants of a European city so as to reduce them to a state of medieval deprivation in which they were in constant fear of death. In the period covered in this Indictment, there was nowhere safe for a Sarajevan, not at home, at school, in a hospital, from deliberate attack.

— Prosecution Opening Statement, ICTY vs Stanislav Galić, 2003

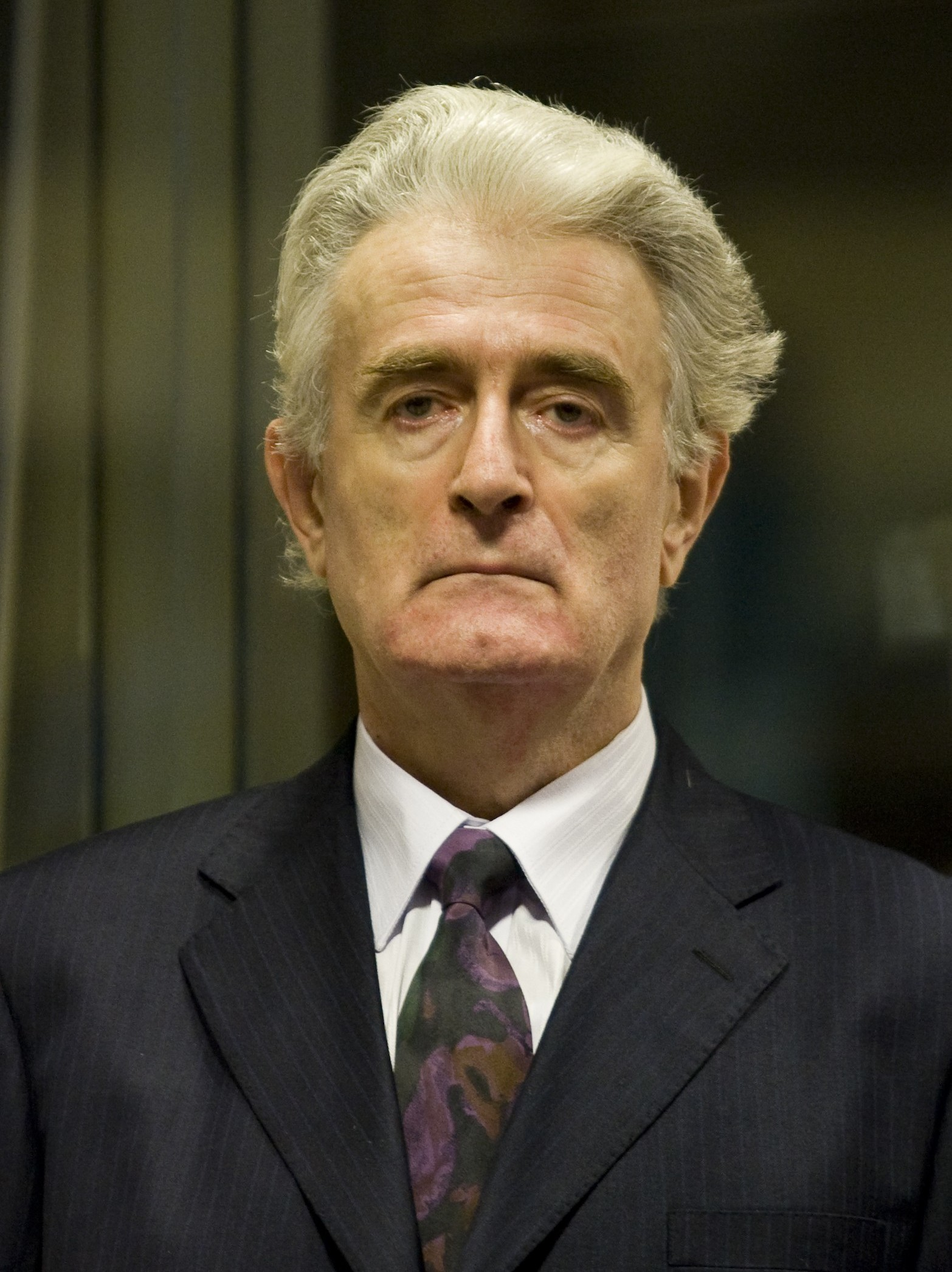
Karadžić at his trial in July 2008.

In 2007, General Dragomir Milošević, who replaced Galić as commander of the Sarajevo-Romanija Corps, was found guilty of the shelling and sniper terror campaign against Sarajevo and its citizens from August 1994 to late 1995, including the second Markale massacre. He was sentenced to 29 years in prison. The ICTY concluded that the Markale town market was hit on 28 August 1995 by a 120 mm mortar shell fired from Sarajevo-Romanija Corps positions. In 2011, the former Chief of the General Staff of the Yugoslav Army, General Momčilo Perišić, was sentenced to 27 years in prison for aiding and abetting murder because the army under his supervision provided "large-scale logistic support in ammunition, fuel and spare parts" as well as "necessary expert assistance" to the VRS during the siege. According to an estimate of the Main Staff from 1994, the VRS received about 25 million bullets and over 7,500 shells from the Yugoslav army to wage the war in Bosnia. However, the judges ruled that Perišić did not have effective control over the VRS officers, who largely fought independently of his instructions, yet still received payment and benefits from Belgrade. In 2013, Perišić's conviction was overturned and he was released from prison.

In 2016, Republika Srpska leader Radovan Karadžić was found guilty of the Srebrenica massacre as well as 10 counts of war crimes and crimes against humanity. He was sentenced to 40 years imprisonment. In 2019, the appeal he filed against his conviction was rejected and the sentence was increased to life imprisonment.

On 22 November 2017, general Ratko Mladić was also sentenced to life imprisonment after being found guilty on 10 counts.

== In popular culture ==
Several films deal with the siege, including Welcome to Sarajevo (1997), The Perfect Circle (1997) and Shot Through the Heart 1998).

In 2025 Bosnian-Canadian animator Matea Radic directed Paradaïz, an autobiographical animated short film, inspired by her experiences as a child during and after the siege. The title is the Bosnian word for an idyllic place and tomato.

== See also ==
- Sarajevo wedding attack (1992)
- JNA column ambush in Sarajevo (1992)
- Battle of Ilidža (1992)
- Battle of Mojmilo Ridge (1992)
- Battle of Žuč (1992)
- Battle of Azići (1993)
- Operation Lukavac (1993)
- Battle of Grbavica (1993)
- Battle of Vrbanja Bridge (1995)
- Operation Tekbir (1995)
- Sarajevo Tunnel
- Operation Provide Promise
- Operation Deny Flight
- Operation Deliberate Force
- Siege of Bihać
- Siege of Goražde
- Siege of Srebrenica
- Siege of Mostar
- This War Of Mine

== Sources ==
- Bose, Sumantra (2009). Contested Lands. Harvard University Press. ISBN 978-0-674-02856-2.
- Burg, Steven L.; Shoup, Paul S. (1999). The War in Bosnia-Herzegovina: Ethnic Conflict and International Intervention (2nd ed.). M.E. Sharpe. ISBN 978-0-7656-3189-3.
- Hammond, Philip (2007). Framing Post-Cold War Conflicts: The Media and International Intervention. Manchester: Manchester University Press. ISBN 978-0-7190-7696-1.
- Mulaj, Klejda (2008). Politics of Ethnic Cleansing: Nation-state Building and Provision of In/security in Twentieth-century Balkans. Lexington Books. ISBN 978-0-7391-1782-8.
