= Battle of Grbavica (1993) =

Battle for Grbavica
- Part of the Bosnian War
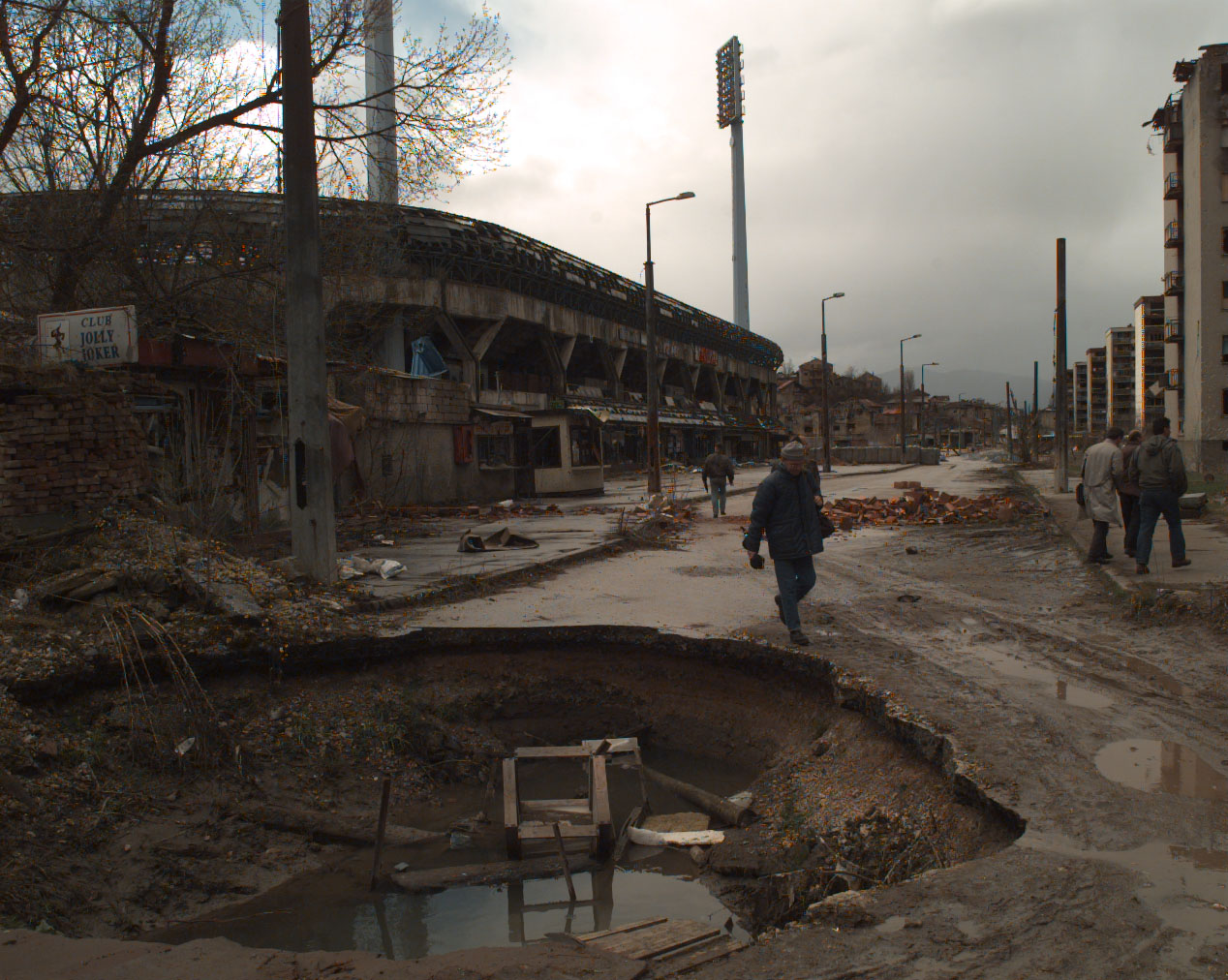
- Photo of a suburb in Sarajevo Bosnia after the fighting that took place between the Serbs and Bosniaks, in a place called Grbavica on 3 April 1996
| Date | October — November 1993 |
| Location | Grbavica, Sarajevo, Bosnia and Herzegovina |
| Result | VRS and RDO victory: VRS successfully defended Grbavica |

Belligerents
| Army of Republika Srpska | ARBiH |

Commanders and leaders
| Aleksandar Škrabov | Unknown |

Units involved
| Army of Republika Srpska: RDO-3 | Unknown |

Casualties and losses
| Unknown | Unknown |

The Battle of Grbavica was one of many battles fought between the VRS and the ARBiH in the Sarajevo municipality. 1993 was the most difficult year for Grbavica, as it was constantly under attack. Until the end of the war, Grbavica remained part of Republika Srpska, but was later transferred to the Federation of Bosnia and Herzegovina under the Dayton Agreement.

== Background ==
Grbavica was primarily a residential area before the war, but its elevated position afforded commanding views of the city. The settlement was captured by Serbian forces early in the conflict and became part of the front line that divided Sarajevo. Serbian forces, particularly those of the Army of Republika Srpska used Grbavica as a stronghold for shelling the city, contributing to a siege that lasted nearly four years.

== The battle ==
Grbavica is a part of Sarajevo, the capital of Bosnia and Herzegovina, which, due to its strategic importance, became a major battlefield.

The Battle of Grbavica was part of a broader effort by Bosnian government forces to break the siege of Sarajevo. The area saw intense fighting as Bosniak forces attempted to retake the territory from the Serbs. In 1993, the ARBiH made many attempts to capture Grbavica, and fighting also took place near the Jewish Cemetery and the Vrbanja Bridge, but the attack on Grbavica failed. The area was heavily fortified by the Serbs, which made all attacks expensive and difficult. In June 1994, the commander of the Russian volunteers, Aleksandar Škrabov, was buried in Grbavica. Bosniaks reduced the number of attacks on the VRS and Russian volunteers in 1994. And in 1995, they turned their attention from Grbavica to an attempt to end the siege of Sarajevo in Operation Tekbir '95, which ended disastrously for the Bosniaks.

== Result ==
The Army of Republika Srpska successfully defended Grbavica from the Army of the Republic of Bosnia and Herzegovina. During the battle, there were also expulsions of non-Serbs from Sarajevo neighborhoods. The Battle of Grbavica was concluded by the Dayton Peace Agreement in December 1995, which ended the war. According to the terms of the agreement, Grbavica was returned to the Federation of Bosnia and Herzegovina.
