= Hakija Turajlić =

Bosnian politician

1st Deputy Prime Minister of the Republic of Bosnia and Herzegovina
- In office 15 June 1992 – 8 January 1993
- Prime Minister: Jure Pelivan; Mile Akmadžić
- Preceded by: Office established
- Succeeded by: Hadžo Efendić

Personal details
- Born: 1936 Čapljina, Kingdom of Yugoslavia
- Died: 8 January 1993 (aged 56–57) Sarajevo, Bosnia and Herzegovina
- Manner of death: Assassination

Hakija Turajlić (1936 – 8 January 1993) was a Bosnian politician, economist and businessman. He served as the first Deputy Prime Minister of the Republic of Bosnia and Herzegovina from June 1992 until his assassination in January 1993.

Prior to the start of the 1992–95 war in Bosnia and Herzegovina, Turajlić was the director of the multifaceted Bosnian company Energoinvest and as such secured large sums of money for war preparations. He was known for his ability to cooperate, especially for persuading everyone through his own self-denial and hard work. His death at the hands of the Bosnian Serb Army in the Sarajevo neighbourhood of Stup was one of the great losses that the Bosnian government was to sustain during the war.

== Death ==
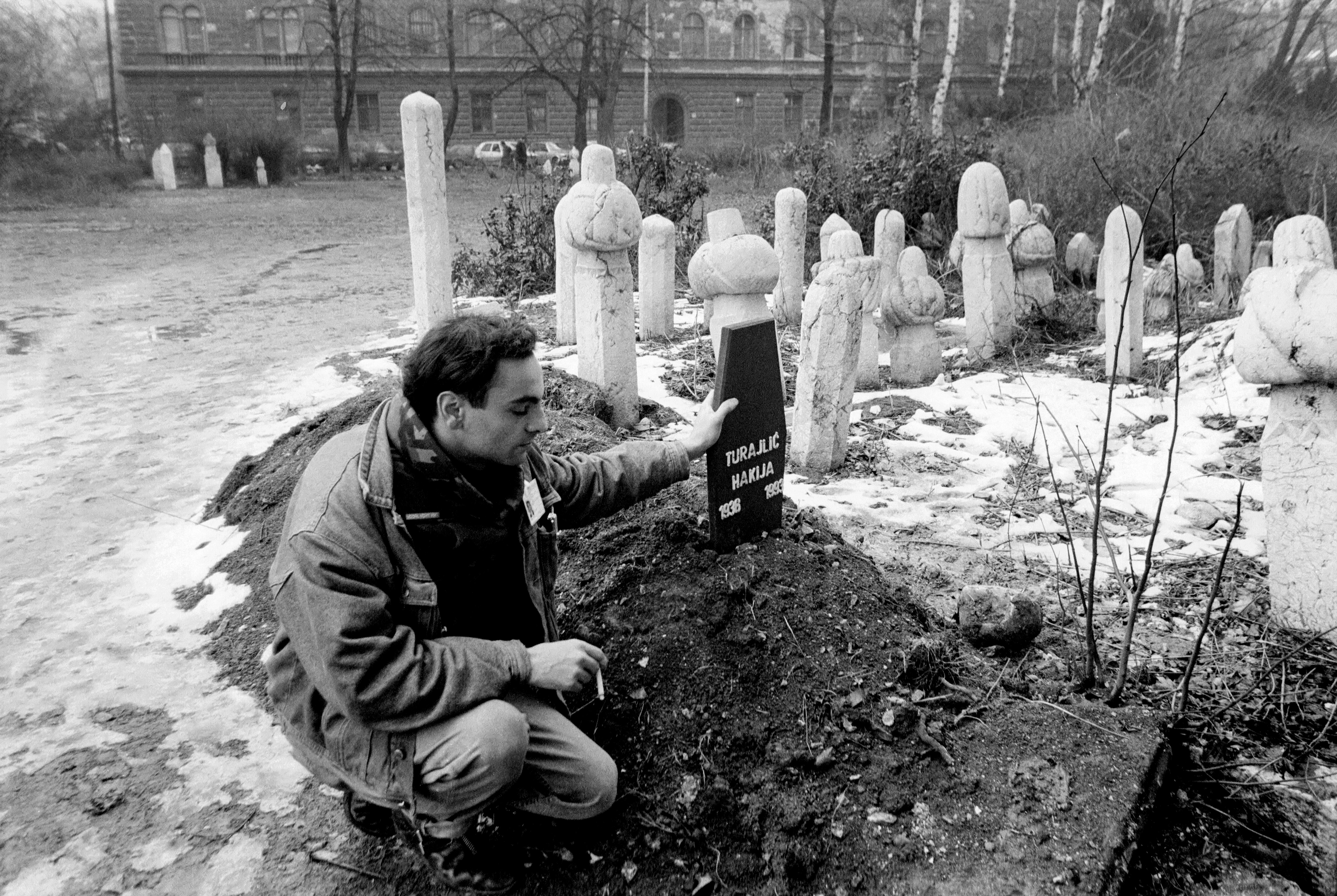
Dutch journalist Robert Dulmers beside Turajlić's grave at the Ali Pasha mosque located in central Sarajevo.

On 8 January 1993, Turajlić went to Sarajevo International Airport to greet Orhan Sefa Kilercioğlu who had accompanied an aid shipment from Turkey. In order to return to Sarajevo he had to pass through Serb-controlled territory for which UNPROFOR was supposed to provide protection. The UN convoy which was taking Turajlić to Sarajevo was stopped by Serb soldiers at a roadblock a few kilometers from the airport. After a 90-minute standoff, a French UNPROFOR officer opened the door to the armoured personnel carrier in which Turajlić was sitting and a Serb soldier opened fire with an AK-47. Turajlić was hit with 7–8 rounds. The French troops did not return fire, call for reinforcements, or detain the killers. British troops who arrived on the scene were ordered to leave.

His death strained relations between the Bosnian government and UNPROFOR and was also the reason that peace talks in Geneva were cancelled. The United Nations and the Serbs both refused to cooperate with the Bosnian government investigation and help find the killer. A Bosnian Serb soldier, Goran Vasić, was eventually charged with Turajlić's murder but ultimately acquitted of that charge in 2002. In 1998, a wall about ten meters long and just under two meters high, reminiscent of the Berlin Wall, was put up by residents in Dobrinja after the Bosnian police entered a Bosnian Serb suburb to arrest Vasić.

== Honors ==
A street in the Dobrinja section of Sarajevo and a street in Sanski Most is named in Turajlić's honor.

A boxing tournament, Memorijal Hakija Turajlić, takes place in Sarajevo every year in his honor. Since 1994, more than 400 boxers from 30 countries participated in this tournament. From 1998 until 2008, it was one of strongest amateur boxing tournaments in Bosnia and Herzegovina.

In Turkey, a street in the Emek neighborhood of Ankara is named in Turajlić's honor.
