= Battle for the Zaglavak Hill =

1993 battle of the Bosnian War

Defense of Zaglavak Hill
- Part of the Bosnian War
Date	12 April 1993
Location	Zaglavak Hill, Bosnia and Herzegovina
Result	VRS and RDO victory: VRS defends successfully the hill

Belligerents
Army of Republika Srpska	ARBiH

Commanders and leaders
(Republika Srpska) Milenko Lazić; Igor Strelkov; Aleksandar Kravchenko (WIA)	Unknown

Units involved
Army of Republika Srpska: RDO-1; Cossack volunteers; Goražde Brigade	Unknown

Strength
(Republika Srpska) 100-500; Unknown	Unknown

Casualties and losses
3 killed	Heavy

Battle for the Zaglavak Hill also known as Defense of Zaglavak Hill and Operation Zaglavak-93 was an attempt by the ARBiH to take control of Zaglavak Hill and destroy the Serbian forces remaining in the area, as the Serbian brigade had suffered losses and would have been forced to withdraw. Russian Volunteers arrived at the scene of the battle and helped the VRS to defend the hill.

== Prelude ==
Soldiers from the Goražde Brigade already had suffered heavy losses, losing both territory and soldiers and had been forced to retreat on the hill. As this was an important factor for the ARBiH and could lead to fall of Višegrad they kept attacking. When the VRS were about to retreat, Russian Volunteers arrived and aided the defence of the hill.

== Battle ==
Since January 1993 the ARBiH and the VRS had repeatedly fought over the area. The biggest fight occurred on April 12, 1993, when the Serbian forces were about to retreat, the Russian Volunteers arrived and started their Operation Zaglavak-93. The fighting became increasingly intense on both sides, with both losing a recourses and soldiers. As time passed, ARBiH became exhausted and surprised by the resilience of the Russian Forces. They retreated from the area after suffering heavy losses and the whole region was re-taken by the VRS and Višegrad was again secure. During the battle, Aleksandar Kravchenko was wounded in the head but after treatment he returned to fighting. RDO-1 was disbanded later on. One of the main commanders on the Russian side was Igor Strelkov.
