= Orhan Sefa Kilercioğlu =

Turkish politician

Orhan Sefa Kilercioğlu is the Turkish Secretary of State.

== Defamation case ==
Turkish author Talat Turhan was convicted of defamation of Kilercioğlu in his 1992 book Extraordinary War, Terror and Counter-terrorism. Turhan was ordered to pay damages to Kilercioğlu, but he appealed to the European Court of Human Rights in 2005. The Court stated that the truthfulness of a value judgment did not have to be proven, and that Turhan's opinion was based on information which was already known to the general public. According to the Court, the Turkish courts did not establish why the protection of the personality rights of a public figure weighed more heavily than Turhan's right to freedom of expression on a public issue. The Court therefore unanimously found that Turhan's right to freedom of expression had been violated. He was awarded. €3,100.

== Notes ==
1. - The Court held that Turhan had based his opinion on statements made by Kilercioğlu in an interview, which had already been published in a magazine.
