= Robert Dulmers =

Dutch writer and journalist

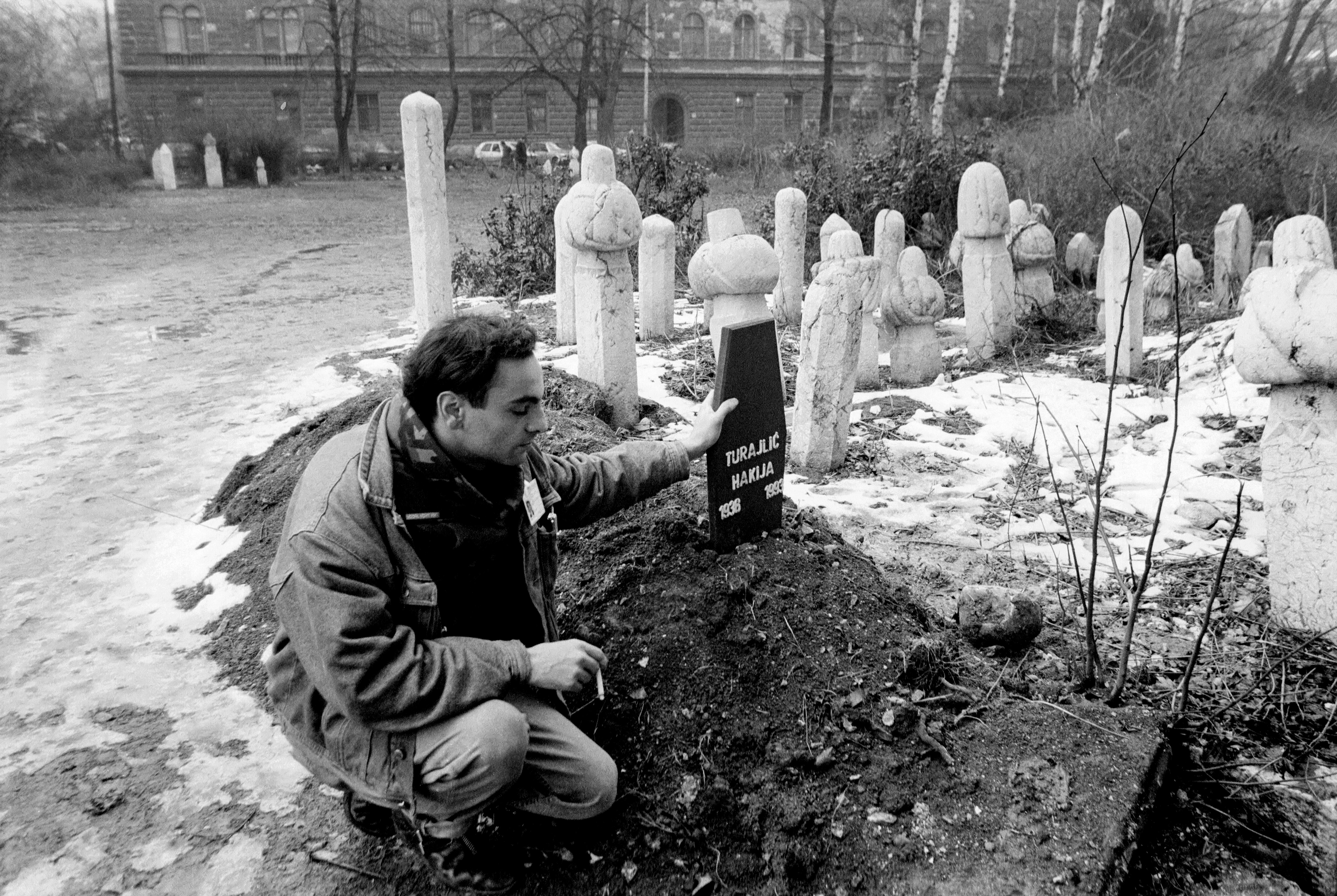
Robert Dulmers in March 1993 at the grave of Hakija Turajlić (Sarajevo)

Robert Dulmers (born 12 June 1965 in Vienna) is a Dutch writer and journalist. Dulmers is known for his years of reporting from the former Yugoslavia during the Yugoslav Wars, during which he was arrested and interrogated. He has written several books, one based on his experiences in the former Yugoslavia and another, on Pope John Paul II's succession, based on years he spent studying for the priesthood in Rome. Dulmers mostly works freelance and has built a reputation as a single-minded and somewhat eccentric writer, difficult to work with but highly praised by his colleagues.

== Biography ==
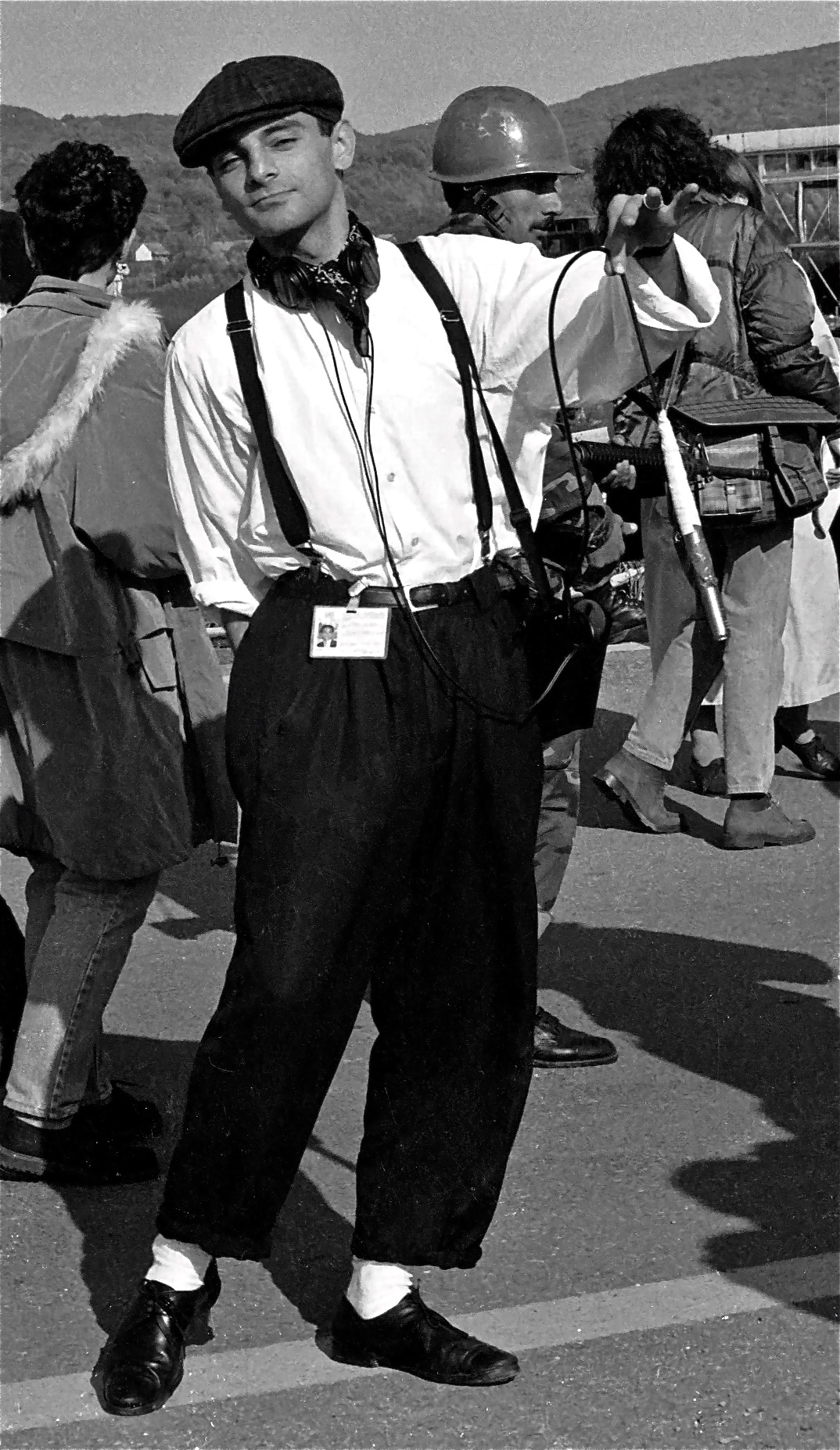
Dulmers clowning during a standoff between RSK militia and UNPROFOR personnel at an RSK roadblock near Vukovar on the Brotherhood and Unity Highway, 1992

Dulmers worked freelance in 1981–1982 for the VPRO's news program BGTV, and wrote a series of articles for Vrij Nederland with Frits Abrahams. He studied philosophy at the Universiteit van Amsterdam, and in September 1991 left for Graz to study with the Jesuits for a year. From Graz he traveled to Croatia, where the Yugoslav Civil War had just broken out, and reported for Dutch radio from East Slavonia. In the following years he reported from and lived in Osijek, Zagreb, Split and Sarajevo, working freelance for the ANP, the largest Dutch press agency.

Dulmers was arrested on 19 May 1992 in Doboj, Bosnia and Herzegovina, by a Bosnian Serb militia while traveling with one of the UNHCR food convoys, and charged with espionage. He was released on 29 May after intervention by the Red Cross, after "reportedly [being] beaten and threatened with execution". As a result of his experiences Dulmers was able to testify against Bosnian Serb paramilitary group leader Nikola Jorgic, who was sentenced to life in prison for genocide in 1997. Dulmers' colleague, photographer Teun Voeten, had stayed with him in Osijek, Croatia, while the town was being shelled by Bosnian Serb forces in October 1991, and described how Dulmers, who knew everyone in town, walked around the ruins with a long black leather coat covering a tuxedo, and slept in the basement of the local clergy house among the pickles. Voeten commented that he and Dulmers crossed paths frequently in years to come: they often disagreed and usually fought, but, he said, Dulmers had a "brilliant mind and a tender soul". Reviewing Zwart ("Black"), Dulmers' autobiographical novel based on his experiences in former Yugoslavia, Voeten called it "an impressive and, as far as I know, unique book for Dutch literature: a philosophical confessional novel with homo-erotic subtext, Bildungsroman and ruthless war reporting at the same time".

=== After Yugoslavia ===
In the late 1990s Dulmers worked, still as a freelance writer, for a number of Dutch publications including again Vrij Nederland, which fired him in 1999 after he was charged with plagiarism: one paragraph (five sentences) in a long article on safe sex was copied from the Internet. The magazine's editor-in-chief commented that everything else in the article checked out, and that he couldn't understand why Dulmers had copied the "unnecessary" paragraph. In the same magazine, Dutch writer Natasha Gerson commented on Dulmers, after comparing him with notorious and unconventional writers such as Gerard Reve and Charles Bukowski, "Dulmers is of that type whose passing people lament, and wonder why such people are no longer around, when the answer is clear: our world, today, does not tolerate brilliant and curious – and enervating – individuals such as him".

His years in former Yugoslavia had brought Dulmers to "the edge of insanity", and in 1998 he decided to study theology at the Pontifical Gregorian University, Rome, to become a priest. He did not, in the end, become one, but used his experience in the Vatican to write a book on the final years of Pope John Paul II and the process of electing a new pope, Wachten op witte rook: De opvolging van Johannes Paulus II ("Waiting for white smoke: the succession of John Paul II", 2004).

Dulmers reported in 2009 on the trial of former Bosnian Serb president Radovan Karadžić. In 2014, Dulmers went to Syria with Teun Voeten, in hopes of an interview with president Bashar al-Assad. They did not interview Assad but were allowed to visit for coffee (having brought Pierre Marcolini bonbons for Mrs. Assad), and published their report in De Groene Amsterdammer. Dulmers commented afterward that in war journalism it is frequently impossible to report on both sides: "If they [the rebels] find out that I visited at the presidential office, then I'm finished".

In 2022, he went to Ukraine to cover the Russian invasion as a correspondent for Nederlands Dagblad. When he posted a photo of the aftermath of a Russian rocket attack on a fuel warehouse in Odessa on Twitter, he was arrested and accused of revealing state secrets. He claimed to have been violently detained and intimidated by Ukrainian security forces. On April 3, 2022, he was expelled from Ukraine and banned from re-entering the country for 10 years.

== Bibliography ==
- Phaëthon (1989) (Picaron Editions). ISBN 9071466426
- Zwart (2003) (Meulenhoff). ISBN 90 290 7311 X
- Wachten op witte rook: De opvolging van Johannes Paulus II (2004) (Meulenhoff) ISBN 90 290 7575 9
- Bonbons voor Mevrouw Assad. Achter de Linies van het Syrische Regime (2016) (Meulenhoff) ISBN 9789029091299

== Awards and nominations ==
- 2016 Winner of De Loep – Dutch and Flemish Grand Award for Investigative Journalism
- 2016 Nomination for the Lira- Scherpenzeel Award – Dutch Prize for outstanding Foreign Journalism
- 2017 Nomination for the Bob den Uyl Award – Dutch Award for the Best Travel Book
