= Russian Volunteers Units in Bosnia =

Russian Volunteer Units
- Руски добровољачки одреди Российские добровольческие отряды
- Flag of the Russian Volunteer Units
- Active: September 1992–1996
- Allegiance: Republika Srpska
- Branch: Army of Republika Srpska
- Type: Infantry
- Size: 700
- Garrison/HQ: Trebinje (1992), Višegrad (1992–1996)
- Engagements: Bosnian War; Operation Bura; Battle of Višegrad (1993); Battle for the Zaglavak Hill; Operation Prača 93; Operation Star '94; Operation Tekbir '95; Operation Krivaja '95

The Russian Volunteer Units was a unit of Russian volunteers that fought in the Bosnian War on the side of the Army of the Republika Srpska. During the Bosnian war 40 Russian soldiers were killed and 20 were injured. The number of Volunteers was around 700 soldiers.

== Volunteer combat units ==
=== RDO-1 ===
In September 1992, the first Russian volunteer detachment in Bosnia was formed in the town of Trebinje in eastern Herzegovina, numbering 10 fighters. It was led by former marine Valeriy Vlasenko. It fought against the HVO and units of the HV during September and December 1992. The core of the detachment was a group of volunteers from Saint Petersburg. The detachment operated as part of a consolidated Serbian-Russian unit within the Bosnian Serb Army. By the end of 1992, RDO-1 ceased to exist.

It was in RDO-1 that some of the traditions of the volunteers and elements of the uniform, such as black berets and monarchical symbols, were established. They considered their symbols to be the black-yellow-white flag and a large bronze-colored double-headed eagle with the image of Saint George the Victorious on its chest. Monarchism, as a rule, was not a political belief, but rather part of the tradition.

=== RDO-2 ===
RDO-2, called "King's Wolves" due to the monarchist beliefs of several of its members, it was formed on 1st November 1992 in Višegrad. Its commander was 27-year-old Aleksandr Mukharev, who fought in the spring and summer of 1992 in Transnistria, and was given the call sign "As" by his initials. Igor Girkin, became deputy commander. According to the volunteers themselves, the name "King's Wolves" did not take root in the detachment, but was widely used in the press. A distinctive feature of RDO-2 was the wearing of black berets. The first operation of the RDO-2 fighters was to push out ARBiH form the Višegrad region.

The first clash with the enemy took place deep in the Bosnian rear. In the last two months of 1992, the detachment, both independently and together with the Serbs, carried out a series of successful attacks and reconnaissance operations, but on 1 December, the detachment suffered its first losses, Muscovite Andrei Nimenko was killed and another fighter was seriously wounded.

On 28 January 1993, the main body of the "King's Wolves" moved to Priboj, taking with them the detachment's flag. In the vicinity of Priboj, the detachment fought successfully for about two months. Then, on 27 March, the "King's Wolves" moved to the western outskirts of Sarajevo, to Ilidža. From May, they were led by Mikhail Trofimov, who was later killed. In August 1993, the RDO-2 ceased to exist, its banner was handed over to the Church of the Holy Trinity in Belgrade. In July 1993 a plaque with the names of ten Russians who died was placed in this church. In total, about thirty volunteers passed through the detachment, while its usual number was about ten people. In nine months of fighting, the RDO-2 lost four of its members. RDO-2 became the first volunteer detachment with a well-established structure, permanent personnel, and its own traditions. Later created detachments attempted to continue its traditions.

=== 1st Kozačka Hundred ===
At the end of 1992, the formation of a Cossack detachment began in Russia. The initiator was Aleksandar Zagrebov, who collaborated with the leadership of the Višegrad Community in Republika Srpska. Recruitment of Cossacks into the detachment was carried out in several Russian cities, including with the assistance of the military commissar of Saratov.

The final organization took place in Moscow. Among the members of the detachment were a large number of former military personnel and veterans of local conflicts in the territory of the former Soviet Union. The Cossacks arrived on the territory of the Republika Srpska on 1 January 1993. The largest part of the detachment was stationed in Višegrad, a smaller one in the village of Skelani. They participated in hostilities in this area until the end of April 1993. The Cossacks They took part in the battles for Višegrad, Skelani, Rudo and battles for Zaglavak hill, Stolac hill which stand out.

=== RDO-3 ===
In the fall of 1993, the RDO-3 was formed, consisting of veterans and newly arrived volunteers. In November of the same year, the detachment was led by a former Marine Corps signalman and veteran of military operations in Angola and Abkhazia, 39-year-old Aleksandar Shkrabov.

RDO-3 was based on the southeastern outskirts of Sarajevo, was part of the military unit 7512 and was assigned to the Novosarajevo Chetnik Detachment, which consisted of Serbian and foreign volunteers. The detachment was commanded by Vojvoda Slavko Aleksić. RDO-3 participated in the fighting in the area of the Jewish cemetery in Sarajevo, on Igman, as well as near the settlements of Olovo and Trnovo. In the spring of 1994, the detachment took part in the VRS offensive on Goražde, where it directly participated in the capture and destruction of the Famous "Pobeda" factory. On 4 June 1994, during an attack on the fortification on the Moševačko hill near the town of Olovo, Aleksandar Shkrabov was killed. For some time, the detachment continued to exist, but in the autumn of the same year it disbanded, and most of its fighters transferred to the special detachment "White Wolves", based on Jahorina.

=== White Wolves ===
The White Wolves detachment was established in 1993 as the 4th reconnaissance and sabotage detachment of the Sarajevo-Romanija Corps. It consisted of volunteers and reported directly to the corps command. The detachment was commanded by Srđan Knežević. After the death of Aleksandar Shkrabov, RDO-3 disbanded and a significant part of the volunteers, including those from Bulgaria, Romania and other countries, joined the White Wolves. They fought in Sarajevo, as well as in some other sectors of the front until the end of the war. In the winter-spring of 1996, after the signing of the Dayton Agreement, many volunteers left Republika Srpska. In the fall of 1995, already in the final phase of the war, several volunteers from the "White Wolves" joined the special detachment "Wolves of the Drina", which was part of the 1st Zvornik Infantry Brigade of the VRS Drina Corps.

== Aftermath ==
After the Bosnian war, a monument was erected in Višegrad for the fallen Russian volunteers. A memorial service marking the "Day of Russian Volunteers" is held on 12 April in Višegrad every year, honoring the Russian fighters who died fighting on the side of Bosnian Serbs in the 1992-1995 Bosnian War.

== See also ==
- Foreign fighters in the Bosnian War
