= Herzegovina Corps =

1992–96 corps of the Army of Republika Srpska

Herzegovina Corps Херцеговачки корпус
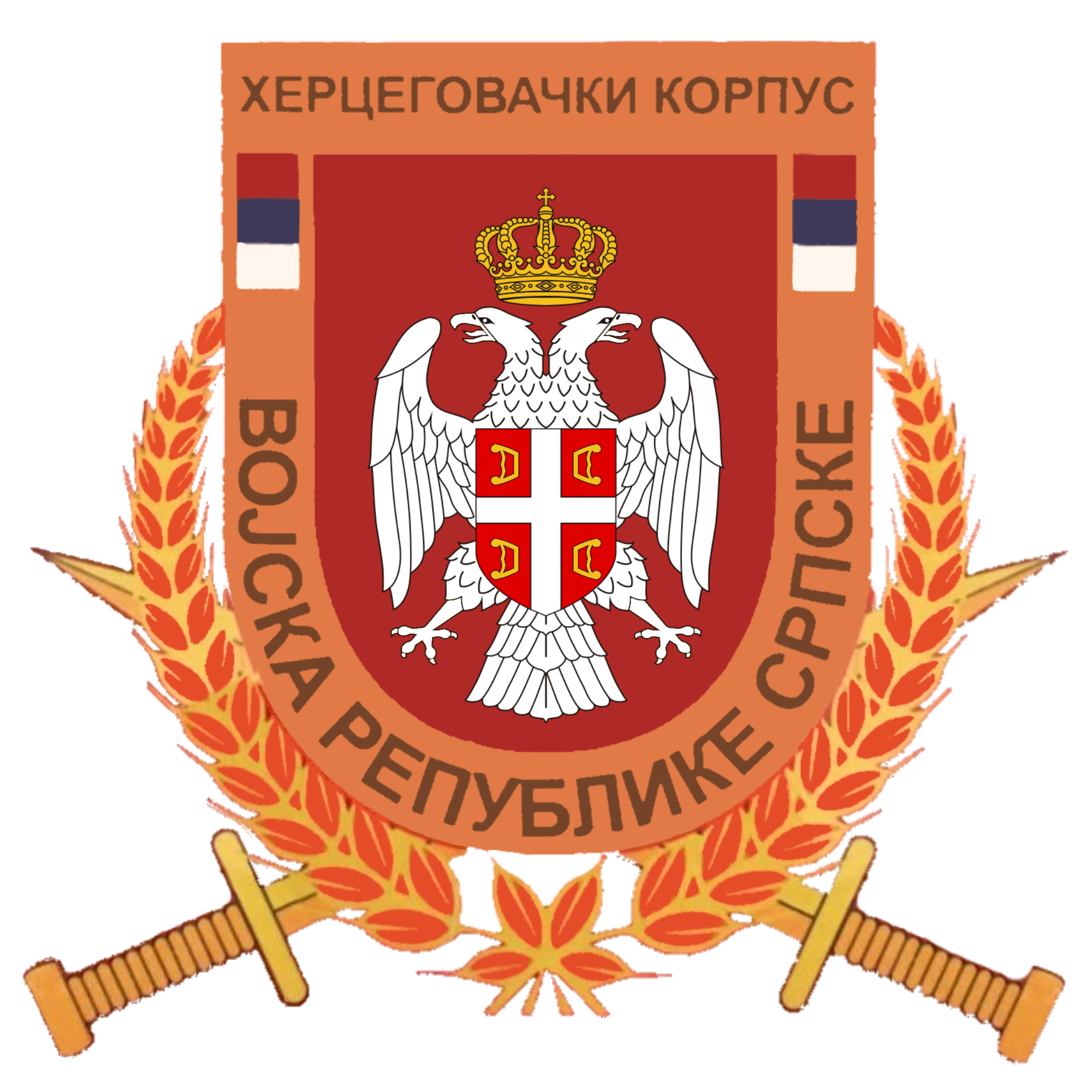
- Emblem of the Herzegovina Corps
- Active: 19 May, 1992 – 1996
- Country: Republika Srpska
- Allegiance: Army of Republika Srpska
- Branch: Ground Forces
- Type: Motorized; Mountain; Armoured
- Role: The protection of the southeastern parts of Republika Srpska
- Size: 21,000
- Garrison/HQ: Bileća
- Anniversaries: 19 May
- Engagements: Bosnian War: Siege of Mostar; Operation Jackal; Battle of Popovo Polje; Operation Bura '92; Operation Lukavac '93; Operation Neretva '93; Operation Star '94; Operation Autumn '94; Operation Tekbir '95; Other operations

Commanders
- Commander: Radovan Grubač (1992–1996)

Herzegovina Corps (Serbian: Xерцеговачки корпус, Hercegovački korpus) was one of the six corps of the Army of Republika Srpska (VRS), established on 19 May 1992. Before implementation into the Army of Republika Srpska, the corps was known as 13th Bileća Corps of Yugoslav People's Army. Commander of the Herzegovina Corps from the start until the end of the war was Major general Radovan Grubač. The corps numbered 21,000 soldiers in total. During the War in Bosnia and Herzegovina around 2,000 soldiers have been killed in action, and around 8,000 soldiers were wounded.

== Organization ==
The headquarters of the Herzegovina Corps was in Bileća. Responsibility zone of the Herzegovina Corps was determined by Popovo Polje, Stolac, Mostar, Boračko Jezero, Treskavica and south of Goražde, over 250 km² of front. Herzegovina corps participated in operations Bura, Lukavica, Autumn, Treskavica and other operations.

== Herzegovina Corps Units ==
=== War-time organization ===
==== Brigades ====
- 1st Guards Motorized Brigade, HQ Kalinovik
- 1st Herzegovina Motorized Brigade, HQ Trebinje
- 8th Herzegovina Motorized Brigade, HQ Nevesinje
- 11th Herzegovina Infantry Brigade, HQ Foča
- 15th Herzegovina Infantry Brigade, HQ Bileća

==== Light Infantry Brigades ====
- 2nd Herzegovina Light Infantry Brigade, HQ Borci
- 3rd Herzegovina Light Infantry Brigade, HQ Kalinovik
- 14th Herzegovina Light Infantry Brigade, HQ Čajniče
- 18th Herzegovina Light Infantry Brigade, HQ Gacko

==== Supporting Units ====
- 7th Military Police Battalion, HQ Bileća
- 7th Signal Battalion, HQ Bileća
- 7th Reconnaissance–Sabotage Detachment, HQ Bileća

==== Artillery Units ====
- 7th Mixed Artillery Regiment, HQ Bileća
- 7th Light Air Defense Artillery Regiment, HQ Bileća

==== Engineer and Support Units ====
- 7th Engineer Regiment, HQ Bileća
- 7th Mixed Anti-Tank Artillery Regiment, HQ Bileća
- 7th Medical Battalion, HQ Bileća
- 7th Motor Transport Battalion, HQ Bileća
- 30th Rear Base, HQ Bileća
- Recruit Training Center (RNC), HQ Bileća

==== Other Units and Commands ====
- Military Court and Prosecutor, HQ Bileća
- Air Force Detachment, HQ Lastva

== Sources ==
- Попара, Радни тим Недељко (2017). Херцеговачки корпус. Билећа: СПКД ”Просвјета”. ISBN 978-99938-90-45-4.
