= Operation Autumn '94 =

ARBiH operation of the Bosnian War

- Part of the Bosnian War
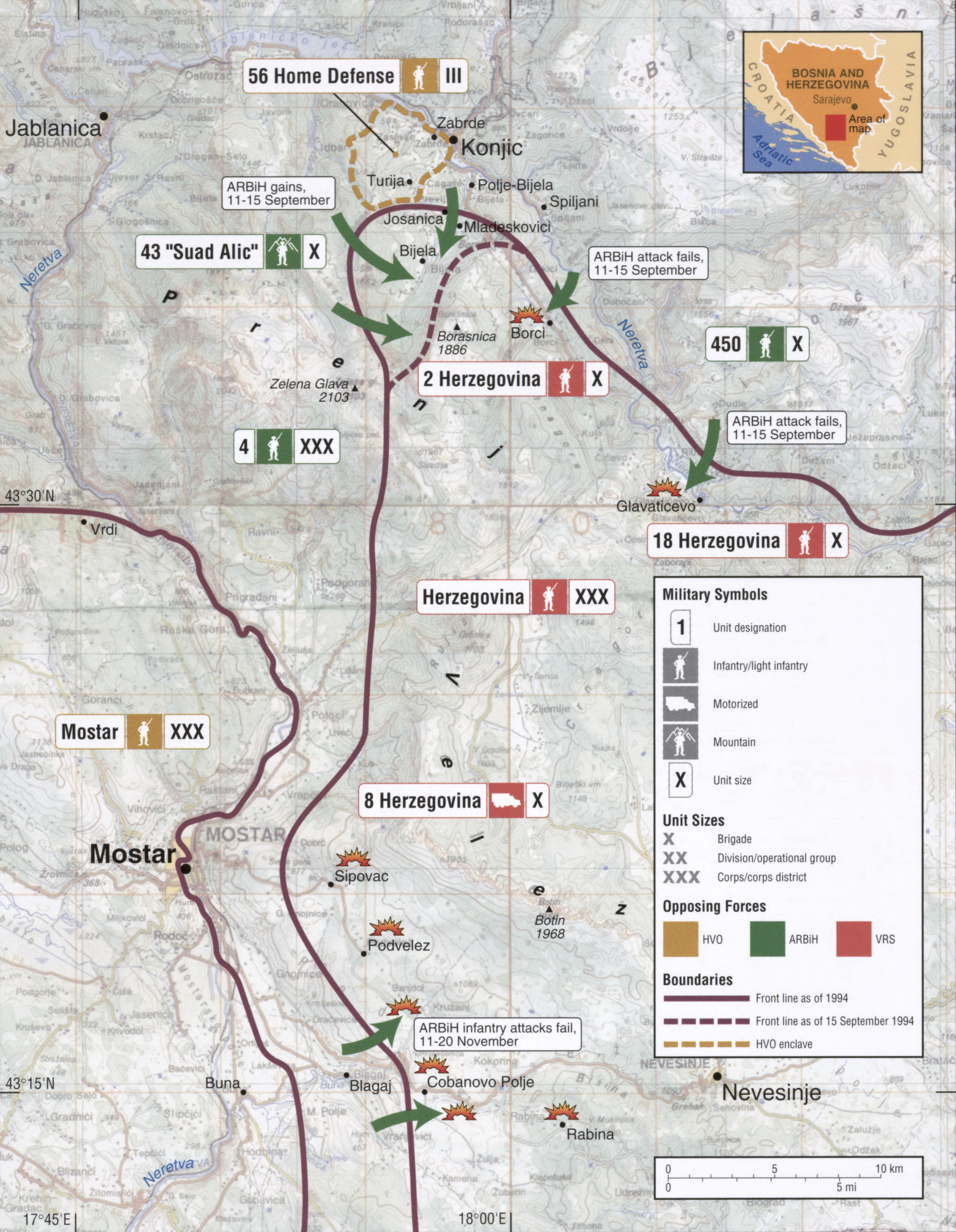
- The front in late Autumn 1994. Operation Autumn '94 is represented by the 2 green arrows south-east of Mostar.
Date	11–20 November 1994
Location	Vranjevići, Podvelež and Velež, near Mostar, BiH
Result	Army of Republika Srpska victory

Belligerents
Republika Srpska	Bosnia and Herzegovina

Commanders and leaders
(Republika Srpska) Zoran Purković	(Bosnia and Herzegovina) Ramiz Dreković (Bosnia and Herzegovina) Nezim "Muderis" Halilović (WIA) (Bosnia and Herzegovina) Esad Humo

Units involved
Army of Republika Srpska; Herzegovina Corps; 2nd Herzegovina Light Infantry Brigade; 8th Motorized Brigade; 18th Herzegovina Light Infantry Brigade; Garda Panteri	Army of the Republic of Bosnia and Herzegovina; 4th Corps; 41st Mostar Brigade; 4th Muslim Liberation Brigade "Škorpioni"; Black Swans

Strength
About 4,000 men	2,600 men

Casualties and losses
22 killed 217 wounded 3 captured	200+ killed Hundreds wounded 113 captured

The Operation Autumn '94 (in Bosnian: Operacija Jesen '94) was an operation carried out by the ARBiH against the VRS during the Bosnian War, with the goal of taking control over Podvelež and Velež, south-east of Mostar.

== Background ==
Following the Washington Agreement in early 1994, ARBiH forces in Herzegovina (the 4th Corps) were able to redirect their attacks against the Army of Republika Srpska's Herzegovina Corps along the Mostar front. Because the ARBiH lacked armored vehicles and large-caliber weapons but held a significant numerical advantage in infantry, they developed a military doctrine relying on the insertion of large sabotage groups behind VRS lines. After the unsuccessful Operation Jezero '94 in October, aimed at VRS positions surrounding Konjic and defended by the VRS 2nd Herzegovina Brigade, the ARBiH shifted its focus to the Mostar-Nevesinje direction, launching Operation Autumn '94. However, the operation suffered from poor planning, and the VRS had already anticipated the attack, allowing them to heavily fortify their defensive positions.

== Offensive ==
The ARBiH began preparing the attack by inserting 1,000 saboteurs, including elements of the Black Swans unit, behind the lines of the VRS 8th Motorized Brigade on November 9. Part of the saboteurs were already found by a group of about 20 fighters in the area of Bruska on that same evening. During the following clashes, 113 fighters of the second battalion of the 41st Mostar Brigade of the ARBiH were encircled, and then captured after the commander of the 8th Motorized Brigade Zoran Purkovic ordered a circular defense and increased vigilance. The following night, more saboteurs continued to insert, but they were met with fierce fire by the Serbian fighters. The battle broke out on November 11, when the ARBiH launched a frontal attack, but the VRS fighters defended all positions, especially in the village of Banjdol. By the end of the day, the ARBiH began to retreat, while minor skirmishes with broken Bosniak groups continued in the following days, that were all repelled.

== Sources ==
- Central Intelligence Agency, Office of Russian and European Analysis (2002). Balkan Battlegrounds: A Military History of the Yugoslav Conflict, 1990–1995, Volume 2. Washington, D.C.: Central Intelligence Agency. ISBN 978-0-16-066472-4.
