= List of settlements in the Federation of Bosnia and Herzegovina/I =

List of settlements in the Federation of Bosnia and Herzegovina - I
| Settlement | City or municipality | Canton |
|---|---|---|
| Idbar | Konjic | Herzegovina-Neretva Canton |
| Ilidža | Ilidža | Sarajevo Canton |
| Ilijaš | Ilijaš | Herzegovina-Neretva Canton |
| Ilino | | |
| Ilovača | Goražde | |
