= Battle for Buna and Blagaj (1993) =

Bosnian War battle

- Part of Siege of Mostar, Croat-Bosniak War and the Bosnian War
Date	13–15 July 1993
Location	Buna and Blagaj, Mostar, Bosnia and Herzegovina
Result	Stalemate: ARBiH captures Blagaj and Buna on 13 July; HVO recaptures Buna on 15 July

Belligerents
Republic of Bosnia and Herzegovina	Croatian Republic of Herzeg-Bosnia; Artillery support: Republika Srpska

Commanders and leaders
Arif Pašalić	Unknown

Units involved
ARBiH; 4th Corps; 42nd/442nd Brigade "Begava"; 41st Mostar Brigade	HVO

Strength
Unknown	Unknown

the Battle for Buna and Blagaj was a military offensive by the ARBiH on the HVO positions on the Dubravska Plateau going from 13 to 15 July 1993.

== Background ==
Since the start of the Bosnian War the Croatian Republic of Herzeg-Bosnia and Republic of Bosnia and Herzegovina fought together against the Yugoslav People's Army, including the Siege of Mostar in 1992 but tensions slowly rose. In early October 1992 the Croat-Bosniak War started. In 1993 the ARBiH began an Offensive in Central Bosnia, weakening the HVO. On 30 June 1993 the ARBiH attacked and captured the Tihomir Mišić Barracks, a hydroelectric dam on the eastern bank of the Neretva River, thus capturing East Mostar completely.

== ARBiH's Offensive on Blagaj and Buna ==
On 13 July 1993 the ARBiH began its Offensive south of Mostar. The ARBiH 42nd/442nd Brigade "Bergava" led the attack onto Blagaj and Buna. The brigade broke through the HVO lines, capturing the Blagaj and then Buna. According to the UNPROFOR, the offensive widen by 15 July with the ARBiH capturing areas as south as Čapljina, 20 Kilometers south of Mostar. That day the command of the 4th Corps was moved to Blagaj.

== HVO counteroffensive ==
On 15 July the HVO began a counteroffensive to recapture all lost territory from the ARBiH. The counteroffensive lasted a day where the HVO, after fierce fighting, retook Buna from the ARBiH but failed to retake Blagaj which the ARBiH kept in till the end of the war. The UN confirmed that the VRS had supported the Croatian forces with artillery. The ARBiH, although capturing Blagaj, had failed to advance even more south from Mostar.
