= 8th Motorized Brigade (Army of Republika Srpska) =

Military unit of the Bosnian Serb Army

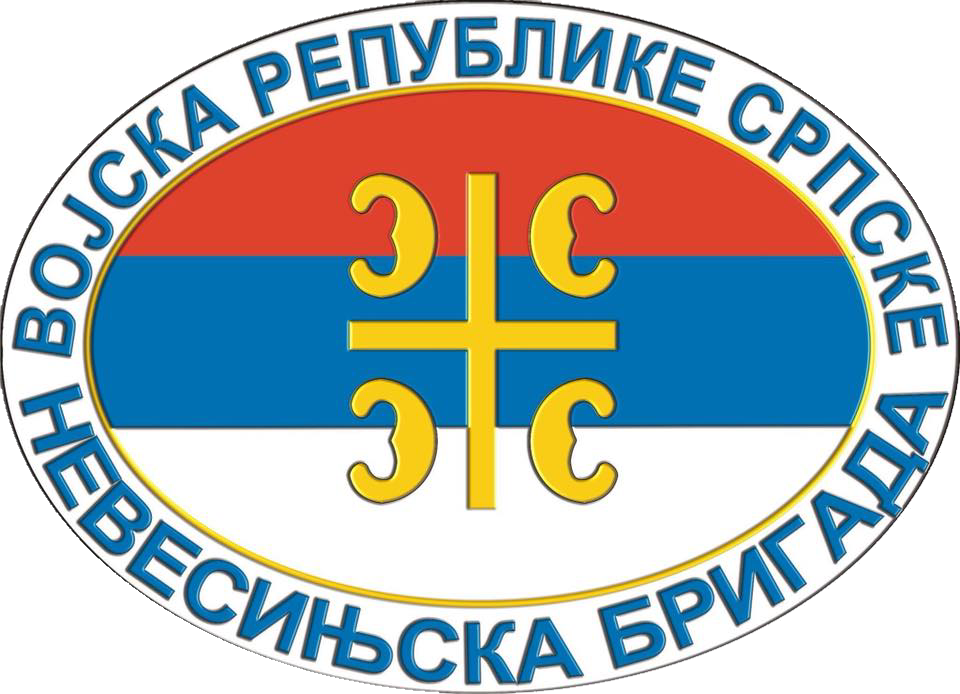
- Logo of the 8th Motorized Brigade
- Active: 1992—1996
- Country: Republika Srpska
- Allegiance: Army of Republika Srpska
- Branch: Herzegovina Corps
- Type: Motorized Brigade
- Role: Defence of Nevesinje and Mostar
- Size: 3,500–4,000 members
- Garrison/HQ: Nevesinje
- Nickname: Nevesinjska Brigade
- Equipment: List: MB 120 mm mortars: 19; MB 82 mm mortars: 32; MB 60 mm mortars: 14; XA 105 mm howitzers: 12; XA 122 mm "M38" howitzers: 7; XA 122 mm "D30" howitzers: 5; ZiS-30: 10; 90 mm Self-propelled vehicles: 6; PAT 20/3 Anti-aircraft vehicles: 19; PAT 30/2 Anti-aircraft vehicles: 6; S-2M rockets: 50; T-55 tanks: 13; OT M-60 tanks: 6
- Engagements: War in Bosnia and Hercegovina: Siege of Goražde; Operation Jackal; Operation Bura; Operation Lukavac '93; Operation Star '94; Operation Autumn '94
- Decorations

Commanders
- Notable commanders: Novica Gušić (1992–1994); Zoran Purković (1994–1996)

The 8th Motorized Brigade, also called the Nevesinjska Brigade, was one of the units of the Herzegovina Corps of the Army of Republika Srpska. The brigade was officially founded on 16 June 1992 at Čobanovo Polje in Podvelež. It was born from the 10th motorized brigade of the JNA. The brigade was filled with fighters from the municipalities of Nevesinje and Mostar, as well as Serb volunteers from the Neretva valley . The brigade's zone of responsibility was located in the municipalities of Mostar, Konjic, Nevesinje, Stolac and served the defense of Eastern Herzegovina. The first commander was Novica Gušić, while his successor was Zoran Purković. During the Bosnian War, the brigade defended the city of Nevesinje and the western parts of Eastern Herzegovina and participated mostly during Operation Bura and in Operation Autumn '94. The brigade lost 476 soldiers during the war.

== Literature ==
- Zoran Janjic (2017). The Nevesin Brigade in the 1992-1995 war. Nevesinje. ISBN 978-99938-722-9-0.
- The first Mitrovdan offensive on Eastern Herzegovina in 1992. 2017.
- Herzegovina Corps. 2017.
