= 4th Corps (Army of the Republic of Bosnia and Herzegovina) =

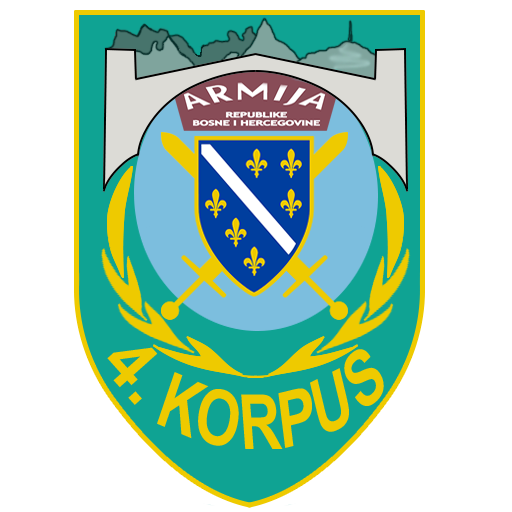
- 4th Corps Patch
- Active: 17 November 1992 – 1995
- Country: Bosnia and Herzegovina
- Allegiance: Army of the Republic of Bosnia and Herzegovina
- Branch: Regular Army
- Type: Motorized, Mountain and Infantry
- Size: 18,000–20,000
- Garrison/HQ: Mostar
- Colors: Green and yellow
- Engagements: Siege of Mostar; Operation Bura; Operation Neretva '93; Operation Autumn '94

Commanders
- Notable commanders: Arif Pašalić; Sulejman Budaković; Ramiz Dreković; Mustafa Polutak

The 4th Corps of the Bosnian army was one of five later seven corps formed in 1992.

== Operational Zone ==
The 4th Corps was mainly responsible for then Mostar, the headquarters of the 4th Corps, and the Mostar region, but also Livno, Tomislavgrad and Trebinje, Konjic, Prozor, Jablanica.

== Commanders ==
- 1st Commander: Colonel Arif Pašalić (until 6 November 1993)
- 2nd Commander: Sulejman Budaković
- 3rd Commander: Brigade General Ramiz Dreković
- 4th Commander: Brigade General Mustafa Polutak

== 4th Corps Units ==
- 4th Muslim Liberation Brigade "Škorpioni" (Konjic)
  - Commander: Nezim Halilović "Muderris"
- 19th East Herzegovina Light Brigade
- 41st Mostar Brigade
  - Commander:

Arif Pašalić, Midhat Hujdur Hujka, Semir Drljević Lovac, Esad Humo, Ramiz Tule

- 42nd Mountain Brigade
- 43rd Mountain Brigade (Konjic)
- 44th Mountain Brigade (Jablanica)
- 45th Mountain Brigade 'Neretvica' (Buturovic Polje, near Jablanica)
  - Commander: Haso Hakalović
- 48th Mountain Brigade (Mostar)
- 49th Mountain Brigade
- 450th Light Infantry Brigade (Bjelimići)
- Military Police Battalion (Mostar)
- Independent Battalion (Prozor)
- Independent Detachments
