= Zaim Imamović (officer) =

Bosniak army commander

- Born: 22 April 1961; Ilovača, Goražde, SR Bosnia and Herzegovina, SFR Yugoslavia
- Died: 9 October 1995 (aged 34); Rogojska Greda, Treskavica, Republic of Bosnia and Herzegovina
- Military career
- Allegiance: (Socialist Federal Republic of Yugoslavia) SFR Yugoslavia; Republic of Bosnia and Herzegovina
- Branch: Yugoslav People's Army; Army of the Republic of Bosnia and Herzegovina
- Rank: Captain
- Conflicts: Bosnian War: Siege of Goražde; Operation Krug '92; Treskavica front; Siege of Sarajevo †

Zaim Imamović (22 April 1961 – 9 October 1995) was a Bosnian military commander in the Army of the Republic of Bosnia and Herzegovina for Goražde enclave during the 1992–95 Bosnian War.

== Biography ==
He was born in Ilovača, Goražde, SR Bosnia and Herzegovina, former SFR Yugoslavia. Before the war, he was a professional soldier in the Yugoslav People's Army and held the rank of Captain.

When Yugoslavia began to fall apart, Imamović was stationed in Slovenia, but the beginning of the war in Bosnia found him in Sarajevo. He returned to his native region and took command of the soldiers there.

His leadership skills were recognized, and he was taken out of the enclave to command a unit that sought to break the siege from outside. He always led from the frontline and was wounded 6 times.

== Death ==
Imamović was killed by shrapnel from a shell on the Treskavica mountain on 9 October 1995, just one day before the ceasefire leading to the final peace agreement.

He was buried on the grounds of the Ali Pasha Mosque in Sarajevo, along with other prominent Bosniak military and political leaders.

== Legacy ==
Imamović's son Ernest is a politician, member of the Social Democratic Party of Bosnia and Herzegovina and current mayor of Goražde, having served since 25 December 2020.
