= Battle of Popovo Polje (1992) =

Croatian offensive in Trebinje

- Part of Bosnian War and Croatian War of Independence
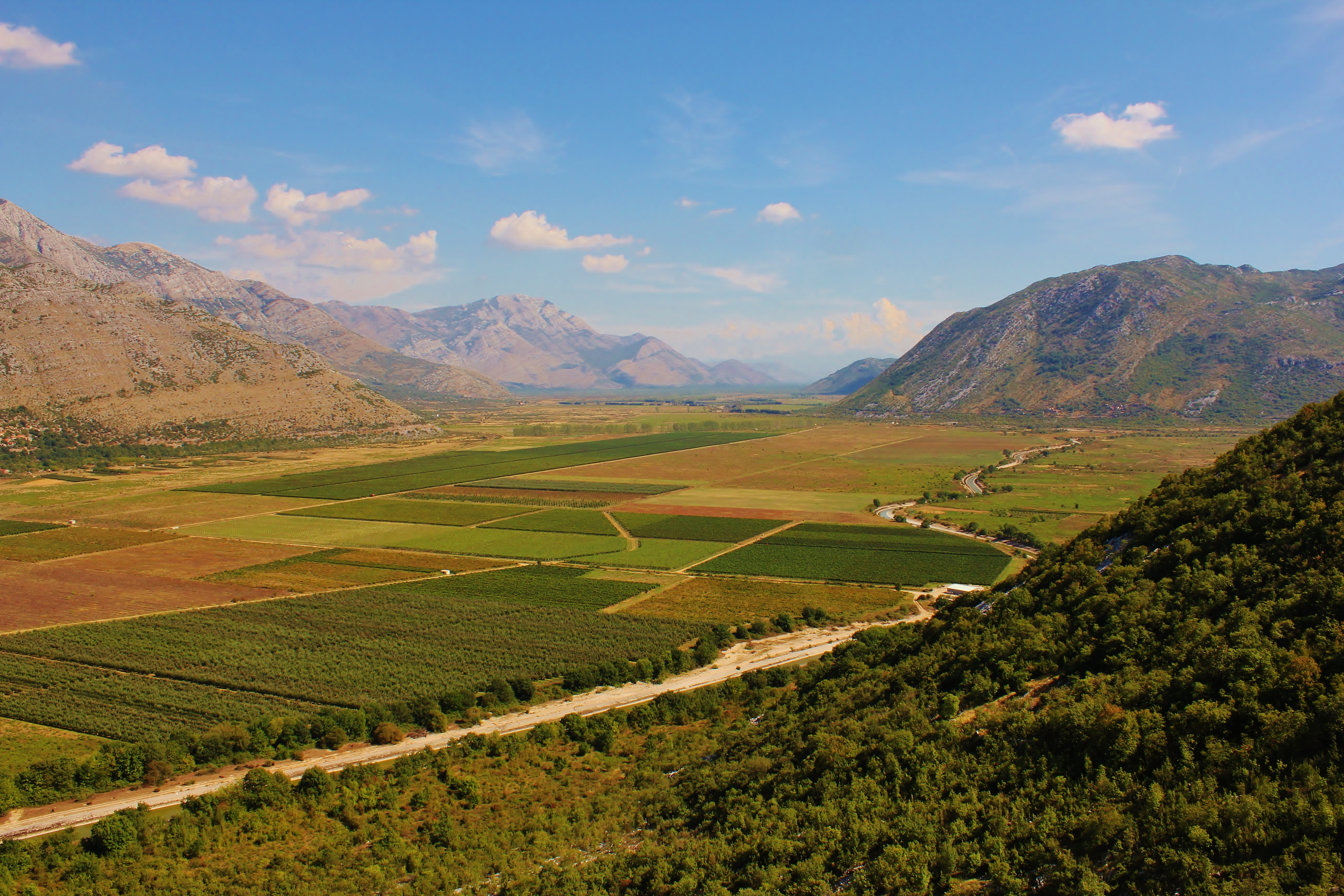
- Popovo Polje
Date	7–13 September 1992
Location	Popovo Polje, Trebinje, Republika Srpska
Result	Army of Republika Srpska victory

Belligerents
Republika Srpska	Croatia

Commanders and leaders
(Republika Srpska) Bogdan Kovač	(Croatia) Janko Bobetko

Units involved
Army of Republika Srpska: Herzegovina Corps	Croatian Army

The Battle of Popovo Polje was Croatian attack on Serbian forces in Eastern Herzegovina, near Trebinje from 7 to 13 September 1992 during the Bosnian War. Croatian goal was to secure the Popovo Polje.

== Background ==
On 1 October members of Croatian National Guard attacked the Yugoslav People’s Army in the village of Ravno killing 14 soldiers. Several days later JNA shelled Ravno, which was carried out from hill near the villages of Veličani and Kotezi, killing dozens of Croatian civilians. All those killed in the bombardment were older than 60 years. Yugoslav army successfully cleared ZNG units from Ravno between 16 and 20 October, however at the cost of killing 24 civilians and destroying the village almost completely.

== Battle ==
One of the Croatian Army's last major attacks on Bosnian Serb forces in Trebinje from Dubrovnik, happened in the first half of September 1992. Offensive started on 7 September when Croatian Army attempted to break Bosnian Serb lines of defence in Popovo Polje in order to gain control over it, which would disrupt road communications Ljubinje–Trebinje. However over the course of several days the Trebinja Brigade managed to hold its positions and after six days, the Guards Brigade of HV ended the offensive. Bosnian Serb forces retained control over the ridge protecting Popovo Polje and the front remained unchanged until the end of war.
