= Operation Bura =

1992 offensive during the Bosnian War

- Part of the Bosnian War and Croatian War of Independence
- Objectives of Operation Bura on the map of Bosnia and Herzegovina
Date	8–13 November 1992
Location	Near Nevesinje, eastern Herzegovina, Bosnia and Herzegovina 43°15′N 18°06′E
Result	Army of Republika Srpska victory: Croatian army operation aborted; No territorial changes

Belligerents
Republika Srpska	Croatia (Croatian Republic of Herzeg-Bosnia) Herzeg-Bosnia; Bosnia and Herzegovina

Commanders and leaders
(Republika Srpska) Novica Gušić (Republika Srpska) Rade Radović	(Croatia) Janko Bobetko (Croatian Republic of Herzeg-Bosnia) Božan Šimović †

Units involved
Army of Republika Srpska (VRS): Herzegovina Corps; 8th Herzegovina Motorized Brigade; Bileća Volunteers	Croatian Defence Council (HVO); Army of the Republic of Bosnia and Herzegovina (ARBiH); Elements of the Croatian Army (HV)

Strength
c. 5,000 troops	c. 8,000 troops

Casualties and losses
42 killed, ~200 wounded	Unknown (estimated at several hundred)

Operation Bura (Serbo-Croatian: Operacija "Bura '92", Операција "Бура '92"), also known as the Mitrovdan Offensive (Serbo-Croatian: "Mitrovdanska ofanziva", "Митровданска офанзива"), was a military operation conducted from 8 to 13 November 1992 during the Bosnian War. It took place in the area of Vranjevići near Nevesinje in eastern Herzegovina, where combined Croat–Bosniak forces attempted to break through the defensive lines of the Army of Republika Srpska (VRS). The battle ended in a defensive victory for the VRS, which maintained control of the region and repelled the attacks.

== Background ==
Following the implementation of the Vance plan, 55,000 JNA personnel from Bosnia and Herzegovina were transferred to a new Bosnian Serb army, later the Army of Republika Srpska (VRS), after the declaration of the Serbian Republic of Bosnia and Herzegovina on 9 January 1992, preceding the 29 February–1 March independence referendum. Bosnian Serbs began fortifying Sarajevo on 1 March, with the first war fatalities in Sarajevo and Doboj on 2 March. In late March, Bosnian Serb forces shelled Bosanski Brod, and JNA artillery began shelling Sarajevo on 4 April.

The JNA and VRS faced the Army of the Republic of Bosnia and Herzegovina (ARBiH), the Croatian Defence Council (HVO), and the Croatian Army (HV), though a UN arms embargo limited preparations. By late April, the VRS had 200,000 troops with heavy equipment, the HVO and Croatian Defence Forces (HOS) about 25,000 with limited heavy weapons, and the ARBiH lacked sufficient heavy weapons for its 100,000 troops. By mid-May, after remaining JNA units withdrew to the Federal Republic of Yugoslavia, the VRS controlled roughly 60% of Bosnia and Herzegovina.

After the disintegration of the Yugoslav federation in 1991–1992, eastern Herzegovina became a contested zone between Serb, Croat and Bosniak forces. By late 1992, units of the Croatian Defence Council (HVO), the Army of the Republic of Bosnia and Herzegovina (ARBiH), and elements of the Croatian Army (HV) sought to push into VRS-held areas of Nevesinje and the upper Neretva valley.

== Timeline ==
In June 1992, Croatian forces launched Operation Jackal (Operacija Čagalj) against the Herzegovina Corps of the VRS, capturing areas around Mostar and Stolac and inflicting the first significant defeat on Bosnian Serb forces. The operation demonstrated the effectiveness of coordinated HV–HVO actions and provided tactical knowledge used in later offensives against the VRS in that area. The new attack coincided with the Serbian Orthodox feast day of St. Demetrius (Mitrovdan), giving rise to the alternative name "Mitrovdan Offensive." The Croat–Bosniak plan was to overrun the VRS defensive belt around Nevesinje and to open a route deeper into Herzegovina.

The combined HVO–ARBiH forces began a large-scale artillery barrage early on 8 November 1992, followed by infantry assaults toward the villages of Vranjevići and Kifino Selo. The VRS defence was led primarily by the 8th (Nevesinje) Motorized Brigade, supported by volunteers from Bileća. The existence of two parallel commands caused problems in coordinating the two armies against the VRS, a structural weakness evident from the very start of the war. Tensions between Bosniak and Croat forces further exacerbated these difficulties, as mutual distrust and competing political objectives hindered effective cooperation during this period. During the attack, the prominent Bosnian Croat commander Božan Šimović was killed after stepping on a mine, which caused a significant morale decline among the Croatian forces. After several days of intense fighting, the offensive failed to achieve a breakthrough. By 13 November, the attacking forces withdrew, having sustained heavy losses.

== Aftermath ==
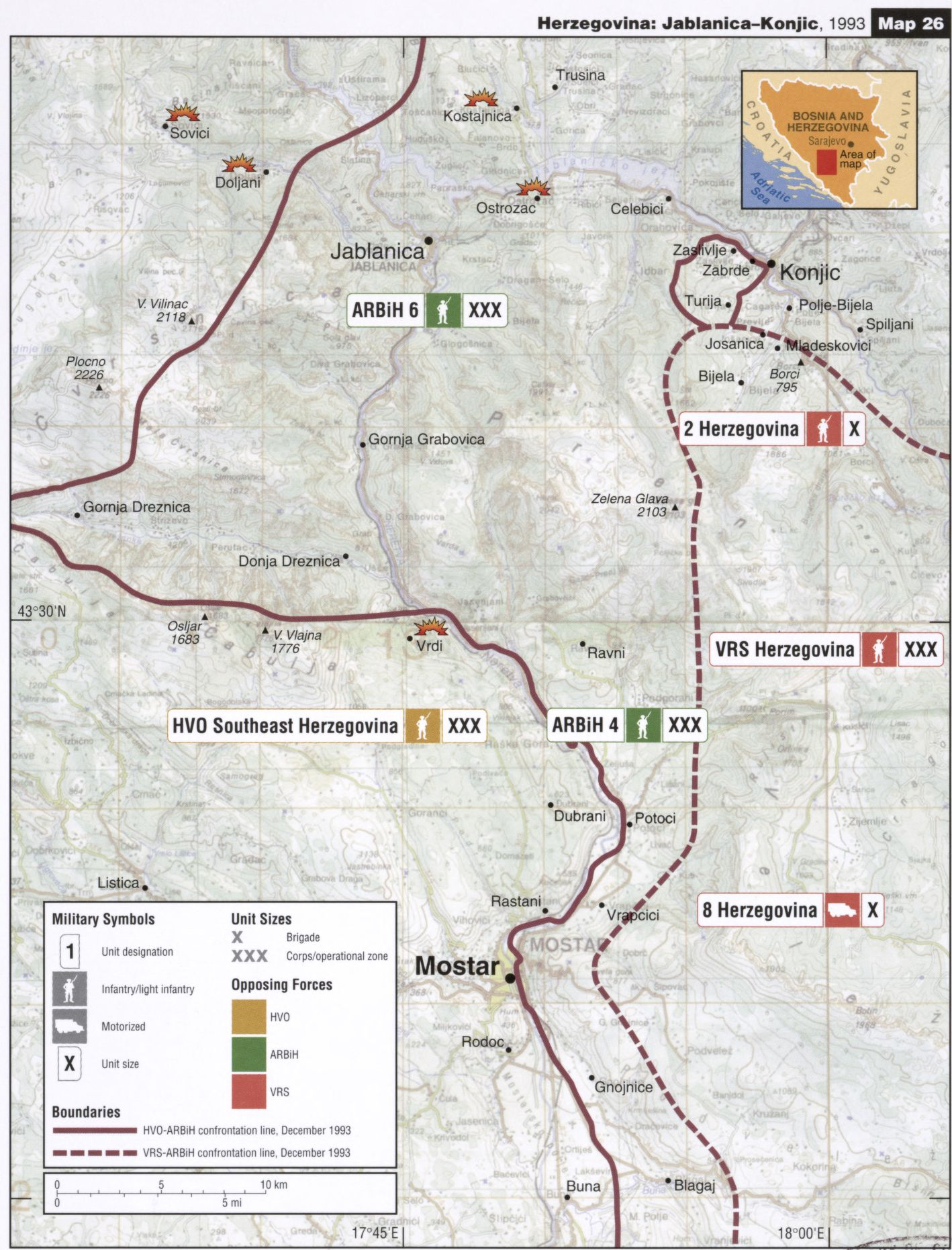
Frontline in central Herzegovina during 1993

VRS reports record 42 killed in action and around 200 wounded. Estimates of Croat–Bosniak losses vary; several hundred fatalities have been suggested in later military summaries, though no official combined figure exists.

Operation Bura ended with the VRS maintaining control over Nevesinje and the wider region of eastern Herzegovina. The failed offensive marked one of the last major coordinated HVO–ARBiH operations before relations between the two sides deteriorated into open conflict in 1993.

In Republika Srpska, the battle is remembered as a key defensive victory and is commemorated annually on Mitrovdan (8 November). Local ceremonies in Nevesinje and Bileća honour participants from the VRS units involved.

== See also ==
- Siege of Mostar
- Croat–Bosniak War
- Army of Republika Srpska

== Sources ==
Books

- Central Intelligence Agency, Office of Russian and European Analysis (2002). Balkan Battlegrounds: A Military History of the Yugoslav Conflict, 1990–1995, Volume 1. Washington, D.C.: Central Intelligence Agency. ISBN 978-0-16-066472-4.
- Central Intelligence Agency, Office of Russian and European Analysis (2002). Balkan Battlegrounds: a Military History of the Yugoslav conflict, 1990–1995. Vol. 2. Washington, D.C.: Central Intelligence Agency. ISBN 978-0-16-066472-4.
- Ramet, Sabrina P. (2006). The Three Yugoslavias: State-Building And Legitimation, 1918–2006. Indiana University Press. ISBN 978-0-253-34656-8.
- Delpla, Isabelle; Bougarel, Xavier; Fournel, Jean-Louis (2012). Investigating Srebrenica: Institutions, Facts, Responsibilities. Berghahn Books. ISBN 978-0-85745-472-0.
- Burg, Steven L.; Shoup, Paul S. (1999). The War in Bosnia-Herzegovina: Ethnic Conflict and International Intervention (2nd ed.). M.E. Sharpe. ISBN 978-0-7656-3189-3.
- Christia, Fotini (2012). Alliance Formation in Civil Wars. Cambridge: Cambridge University Press. ISBN 978-1-13985-175-6.
- "Military Situation in Eastern Herzegovina, November 1992" (PDF). The Hague: International Criminal Tribunal for the former Yugoslavia (ICTY). November 1992. "Summary report submitted as part of the evidence on military operations around Nevesinje during the Mitrovdan Offensive."

News reports

- Bellamy, Christopher (10 October 1992). "Croatia built 'web of contacts' to evade weapons embargo". The Independent. Archived from the original on 10 November 2012.
- Burns, John F. (12 May 1992). "Pessimism Is Overshadowing Hope In Effort to End Yugoslav Fighting". The New York Times. Archived from the original on 19 December 2013.
- Karačić, Marko (14 June 2012). ""Lipanjske zore" i HVO promijenili su tijek rata u BiH" ["June Dawns" and the HVO changed course of the Bosnian War]. Večernji list (in Croatian). Archived from the original on 30 November 2013.
- Wokaunn, Mario (December 2010). "Sjećanje na ratnu bolnicu Metković (1991.-1996.)- U prigodi dvadesete obljetnice od njezina osnutka" [Remembrance of the Metković War Hospital (1991–1996)- on the occasion of the twentieth anniversary of its foundation]. Acta medico-historica Adriatica (in Croatian). 8 (2). Croatian scientific society for the history of health culture: 353–364. ISSN 1334-4366. PMID 21192121.

Journals

- Marijan, Davor (2004). "Expert Opinion: On the War Connections of Croatia and Bosnia and Herzegovina (1991–1995)". Journal of Contemporary History. 36: 265–272.

International, governmental, and NGO sources

- "Prosecutor v. Jadranko Prlić, Bruno Stojić, Slobodan Praljak, Milivoj Petković, Valentin Ćorić, Berislav Pušić - Judgement - Volume 6 of 6" (PDF). International Criminal Tribunal for the former Yugoslavia. 29 May 2013.
