= Treskavica front =

Front during the Bosnian War

Treskavica Front
- Part of the Siege of Sarajevo during the Bosnian War
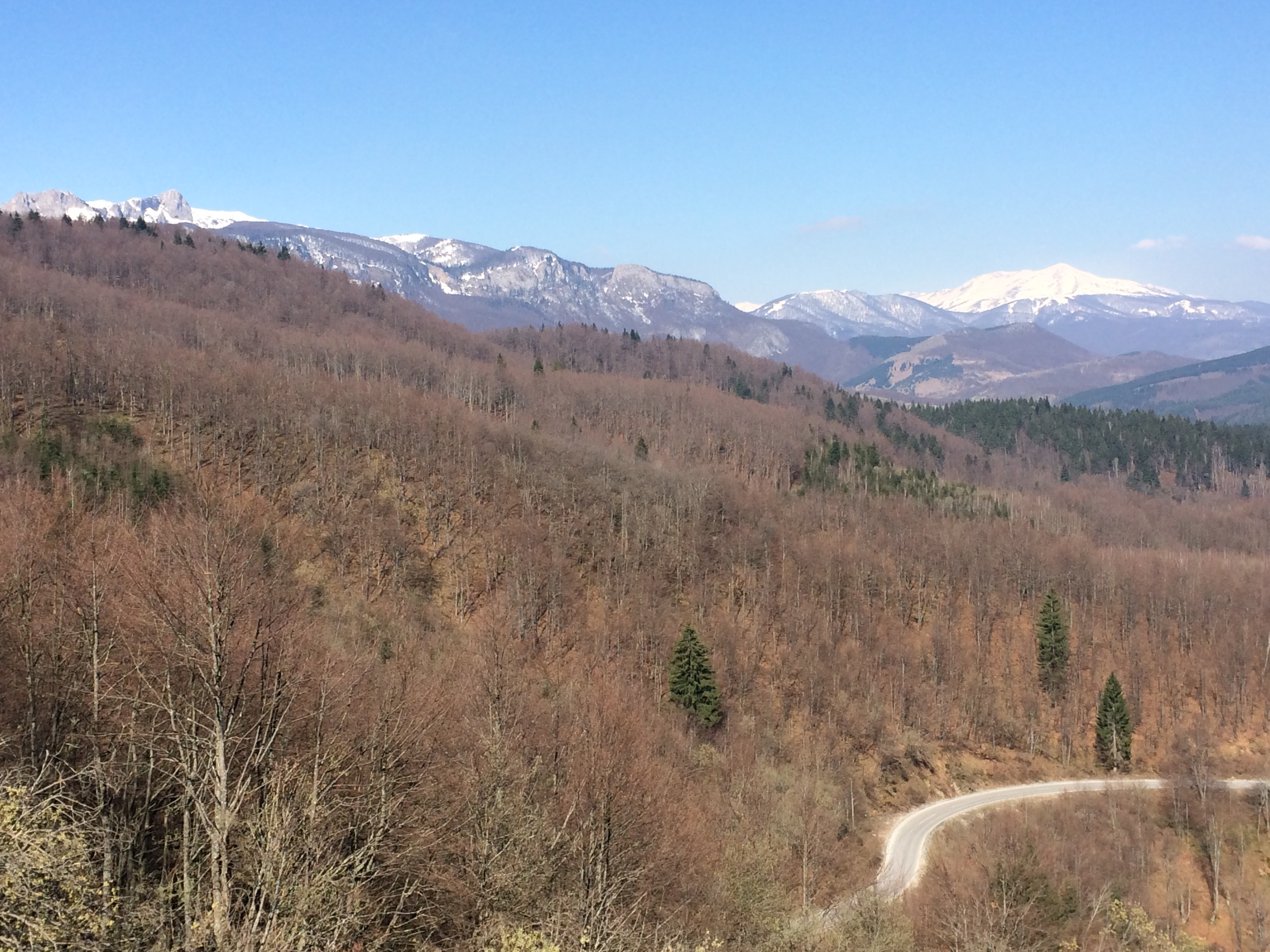
- Treskavica Mountain
| Date | 6 April 1992 – 13 October 1995 |
| Location | Treskavica, Trnovo, Kalovnik, Bosnia and Herzegovina |
| Result | Tactical victory for Army of Republika Srpska: The ARBiH have some territorial gains at Treskavica but later on its re-taken by the Serbian Troops; Dayton Agreement |
| Territorial changes | The summit of Treskavica remains under Serbian control |

Belligerents
| Republika Srpska | Bosnia and Herzegovina; NATO |

Commanders and leaders
| (Republika Srpska) Radovan Karadžić (Republika Srpska) Stanislav Galić (Republika Srpska) Dragomir Milošević (Republika Srpska) Ratko Mladić | Zaim Imamović † |

Units involved
| Army of Republika Srpska; (Republika Srpska) "Herzegovina-Romanija Corps"; (Republika Srpska) Special Unit "Beli Vukovi" | ARBiH; 1st Corps; 2nd Corps; 3rd Corps; 4th Corps |

Casualties and losses
| (Republika Srpska) Heavy | Heavy |

The Treskavica Front was a crucial zone for the Siege of Sarajevo during the Bosnian War. In mid-July 1995, the Army of Republika Srpska (VRS) started a series of offensives on the Treskavica mountain range, causing heavy fighting. The Army of the Republic of Bosnia and Herzegovina (ARBiH) initially had success in pushing back Bosnian Serb troops at various times, but it always resulted in counter-offensives by the Army of Republika Srpska. NATO also bombed Bosnian Serb positions on Treskavica which caused several soliders being killed.

As the war came to a close, VRS forces repelled the last attack by the ARBiH and killed their Commander Zaim Imamović, thus achieving success in protecting the mountain.

== Timeline ==
On 4 July 1995, Army of the Republic of Bosnia and Herzegovina (ARBiH) forces began various attacks on the Army of Republika Srpska (VRS) troops which the VRS successfully fought off and forced the ARBiH to retreat back to the starting frontlines.

On 24 July, the 4th Corpus of the ARBiH achieved a successful attack on southern part of the front, close to the villages of Brda and Hotovle, capturing several villages and advancing 2–3 km towards Kalinovik. However, a counter-offensive by the Hercegovian Special Police stopped the advance. From 1–3 August, the ARBiH was once again forced to retreat back.

Fighting resumed during August and October but on 3rd October, Bosniak troops started an unsuccessful offensive on Northern Herzegovina, mostly in the area of Trnovo and Kalovnik.

The 1st and 4th Corpus of the ARBiH attacked the area of Krupac, north of Trnovo, then launched attacks on the towns of Trnovo and Kalovnik. East of Kalovnik, the ARBiH attacked the protected village of Glavatičevo and Mountain Penj. The potential land to be captured was of consequence to both sides.

The ARBiH successfully captured important points on Treskavica, but around 4 October after a VRS offensive, the area was re-captured and ARBiH forces retreated.

On 10 October, the ARBiH command confirmed that the Treskavica front was a victory for Bosniak forces after capturing a few villages. However, the planned celebration did not happen, as a day later on 11 October a part of the Sarajevo-Romanijan Corps of the VRS began a counter-offensive and called for a special unit ''Beli Vukovi'' who on the same day managed to retake the territory occupied by the ARBiH.

In the last days of the fighting on Treskavica (11-12 October), the ARBiH started their final attack. After heavy artillery and grenades, they aimed at Đokin Toranj, the highest point of Treskavica (2.086). The outnumbered VRS soldiers however, managed to keep the point. At the end of the fighting, the captain of the ARBiH division Zaim Imamović was killed by a sharpnel just one day before the ceasefire and the end of the war.

== Aftermath ==
The Serbs suffered territorial losses at Treskavica, but they were insignificant compared to the results expected by the ARBiH. The main attacks in July and October 1995 were on Trnovo and Kalinovik, in an attempt to conquer them and eventually merge the Goražde enclave with central Bosnia, which proved unsuccessful. The battle is therefore considered a victory for the VRS.
