= Velež (Bosnia and Herzegovina) =

- Вележ
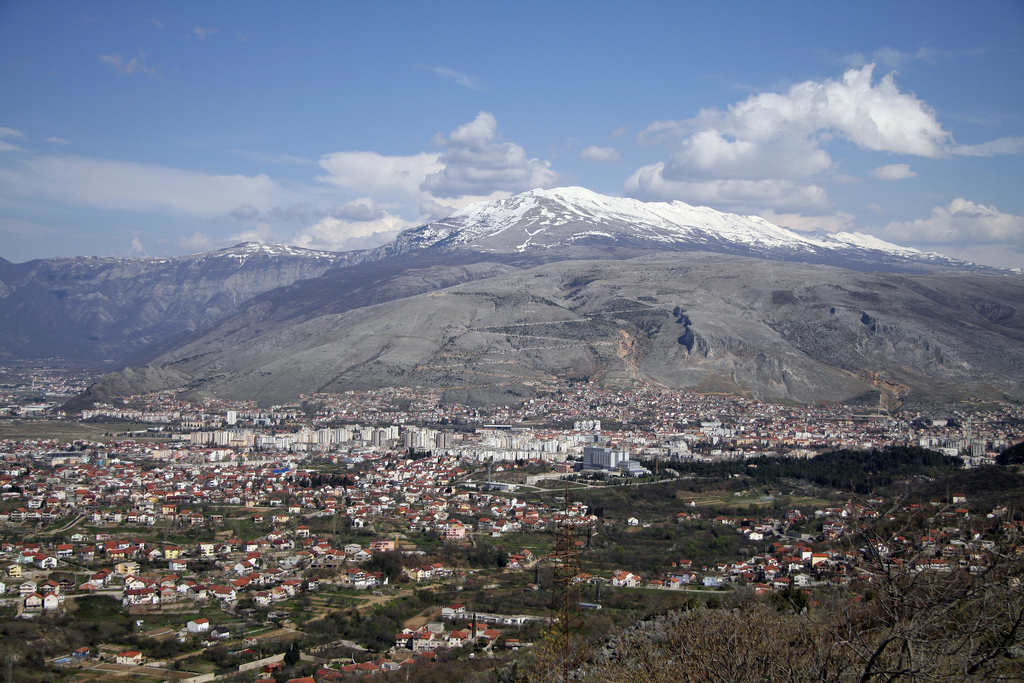
- City of Mostar below mountain Velež

Highest point
- Elevation: 1,969 m (6,460 ft)
- Coordinates: 43°20′00″N 18°00′38″E

Geography
- Location within Bosnia and Herzegovina
- Location: Bosnia and Herzegovina
- Parent range: Dinaric Alps

Velež (Serbian Cyrillic: Вележ) is a mountain in Bosnia and Herzegovina, located in the south-central part of the Herzegovina region, overlooking the largest regional city of Mostar.

The highest peak of Velež mountain is called Botin, and it is 1,969 meters high.

Other large settlements in the Velež vicinity are Nevesinje, which is located in a secluded mountain valley, Blagaj, small historic settlement which is located near the source of the Buna river, and village of Podvelež which is situated immediately below the summit of the mountain.

== See also ==
- Veles
- List of mountains in Bosnia and Herzegovina
