= Mustafa Polutak =

Yugoslav Army officer

- Born: 1 January 1946 (age 80); Goražde, SR Bosnia and Herzegovina, Yugoslavia
- Military career
- Allegiance: Yugoslavia Bosnia and Herzegovina Federation of Bosnia and Herzegovina
- Branch: Yugoslav People's Army Army of Republic of Bosnia and Herzegovina Army of the Federation of Bosnia and Herzegovina
- Service years: 1970–92 (in Yugoslavian People's Army) 1992–97 (in Army of Republic of Bosnia and Herzegovina) 1997–2000 (in Army of Federation of Bosnia and Herzegovina)
- Rank: Colonel (in Yugoslav People's Army) Brigadier General (in Army of Republic of Bosnia and Herzegovina)
- Commands: Army of the Federation of Bosnia and Herzegovina Command

Mustafa Polutak (born 1 January 1946) is a former soldier in the Bosnian Army during the Bosnian War.

He completed the Military Academy direction of the Ordnance in Belgrade and Sarajevo between 1966 and 1970. Between 1980 and 1982, he completed command and staff of Academy in Belgrade (MA). He was promoted in rank of Brigadier general. Polutak also led the Association for the Protection of the achievements of the struggle for Bosnia and Herzegovina and Published several scientific articles in the journal "KORAK".

He is the author of the book: "Kako smo branili Bosnu i Hercegovinu" (How we defended Bosnia and Herzegovina).

== Career ==
- Commander of the Mixed Artillery Regiment
- Organizer and Coordinator of the Territorial Defence in the territory of Central Bosnia
- Commander of Tactical Group 1 "Igman"
- Member of the ŠVK ARBiH (Supreme Command Staff of Army of the Republic of Bosnia and Herzegovina)
- Head of Administration general in GŠ ARBiH (General Staff of Army of the Republic of Bosnia and Herzegovina)
- Commander of 4th Corps of Army of the Republic of Bosnia and Herzegovina
- Commander of Artillery Division of Army of the Federation of Bosnia and Herzegovina
- Head of the mobilization, organization and structure in ZKVFBIH (Joint Command of Army of the Federation of Bosnia and Herzegovina)
