= Siege of Mostar =

Siege of the city of Mostar between 1992 and 1993 during the Bosnian War

- Part of the Bosnian War and the Croat–Bosniak War
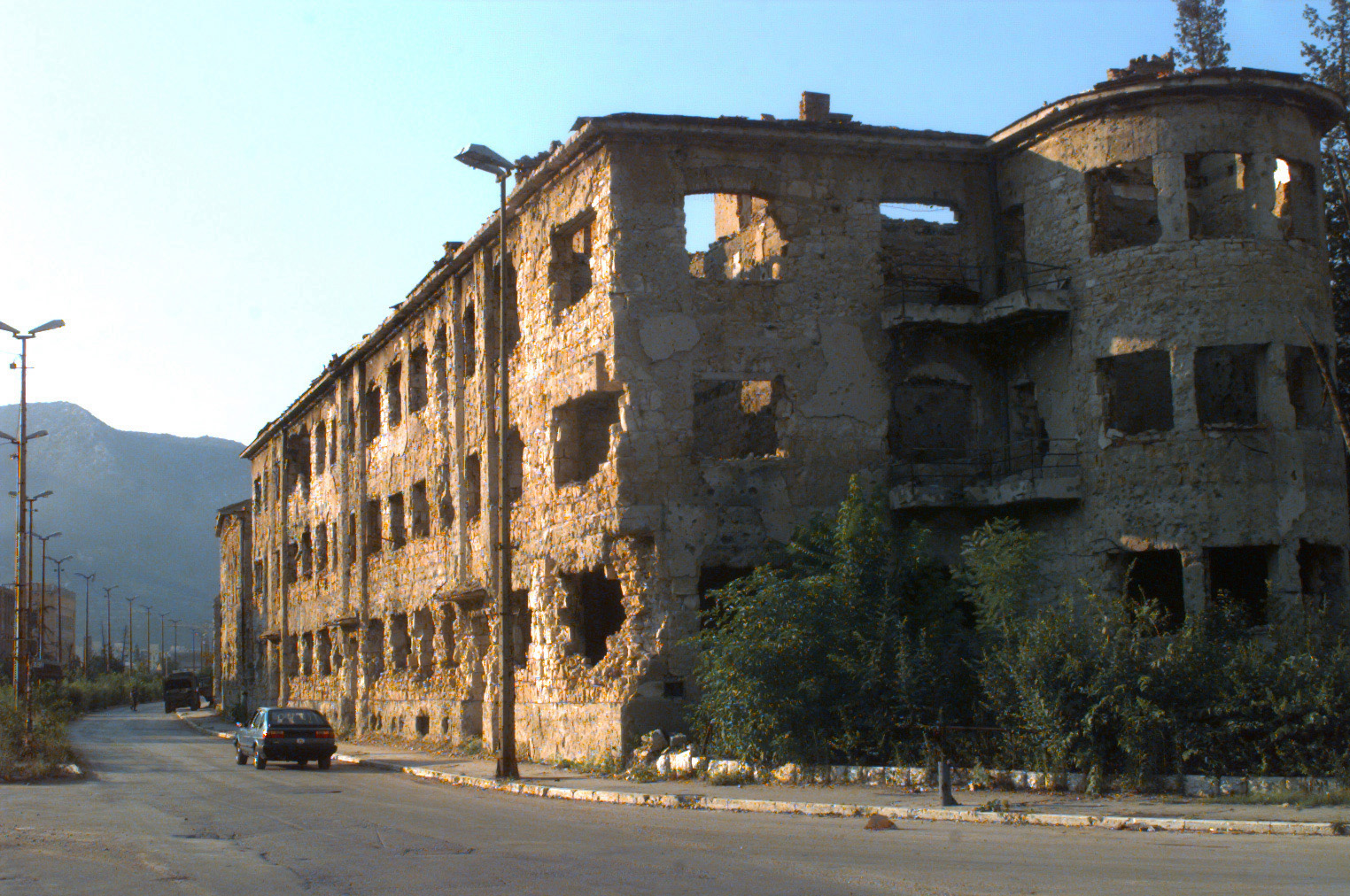
- Destroyed buildings in Mostar after the Bosnian War
Date	April 1992 – June 1992; May 1993 – April 1994
Location	Mostar, Bosnia and Herzegovina 43°20′N 17°48′E
Result	Croat-Bosniak victory (1992); Military stalemate (1994): Ethnic makeup of east and west Mostar homogenized; Widespread destruction of Mostar's cultural heritage

Belligerents
1992: Herzeg-Bosnia; Croatia; Republic of Bosnia and Herzegovina		1992: SFR Yugoslavia; Republika Srpska
1993–94: Herzeg-Bosnia; Croatia	1993–94: Republic of Bosnia and Herzegovina	1993–94: Republika Srpska

Commanders and leaders
Milivoj Petković; Slobodan Praljak; Miljenko Lasić	Sefer Halilović; Rasim Delić; Arif Pašalić	Momčilo Perišić; Radovan Grubač

Strength
12,000 soldiers (1993)	8,000 soldiers (1993)	17,000 soldiers (1992)

Casualties and losses
300 soldiers killed (Croat–Bosniak War); 100 civilians killed (Croat–Bosniak War)	1,200 killed	Unknown

The siege of Mostar was fought during the Bosnian War first in 1992 and then again later in 1993 to 1994. Initially lasting between April 1992 and June 1992, it involved the Croatian Defence Council (HVO) and the Army of the Republic of Bosnia and Herzegovina (ARBiH) fighting against the Serb-dominated Yugoslav People's Army (JNA) after Bosnia and Herzegovina declared its independence from Yugoslavia. That phase ended in June 1992 after the success of Operation Jackal, launched by the Croatian Army (HV) and HVO. As a result of the first siege around 90,000 residents of Mostar fled and numerous religious buildings, cultural institutions, and bridges were damaged or destroyed.

As the wider conflict matured and the political landscape changed, the Bosnian Croats and Bosniaks began to fight against each other, culminating in the Croat–Bosniak War. Between June 1993 and April 1994 the HVO besieged Bosniak-concentrated East Mostar, resulting in the deaths of numerous civilians, a cut off of humanitarian aid, damage or destruction of ten mosques, and the blowing up of the historic Stari Most bridge. Hostilities ended with the signing of the Washington Agreement in March 1994 and the establishment of the Croat–Bosniak federation.

== Background ==
In 1990 and 1991, Serb political leadership in Croatia and Bosnia and Herzegovina established a number of Serbian Autonomous Regions. As tensions escalated, elements of the Yugoslav People's Army (JNA) increasingly supported Serb forces in these areas. From late 1990, the JNA began arming Serb formations in Bosnia and Herzegovina and assisting in their organization. By March 1991, it had distributed an estimated 51,900 firearms to Serb paramilitary units and 23,298 firearms to members of the Serbian Democratic Party (SDS). The Croatian government began arming Croats in the Herzegovina region in 1991 and early 1992, anticipating the spread of the conflict into Bosnia and Herzegovina. It also provided support to elements of the Bosniak community. From July 1991 to January 1992, JNA units and Serb forces used Bosnian territory in operations against Croatia. During the war in Croatia, Bosnian president Alija Izetbegović issued a televised statement declaring neutrality, stating that "this is not our war", and the Sarajevo government initially did not take significant defensive measures against a potential attack by Bosnian Serb forces and the JNA.

On 25 March 1991, Croatian president Franjo Tuđman met with Serbian president Slobodan Milošević in Karađorđevo, reportedly to discuss the partition of Bosnia and Herzegovina. In November, the autonomous Croatian Community of Herzeg-Bosnia (HZ H-B) was established, it claimed it had no secessionary goal and that it would serve a "legal basis for local self-administration". It vowed to respect the Bosnian government under the condition that Bosnia and Herzegovina was independent of "the former and every kind of future Yugoslavia." Mate Boban was established as its president. In December, Tuđman, in a conversation with Bosnian Croat leaders, said that "from the perspective of sovereignty, Bosnia-Herzegovina has no prospects" and recommended that Croatian policy "support for the sovereignty [of Bosnia and Herzegovina] until such time as it no longer suits Croatia."

After the JNA's participation in the Croatian War of Independence, JNA units were regarded as an occupation force by the Croats of Mostar. It was perceived as a force friendly to the Serbs and hostile to Croats and Bosniaks (Bosnian Muslims). On 4 February 1992, local Croat citizens blockaded the roads from Mostar to Čitluk and Široki Brijeg in protest over the behavior of JNA reservists in the area. On 6 February Serbs blockaded the road from Mostar to Sarajevo. On 29 February and 1 March 1992 an independence referendum was held in Bosnia and Herzegovina. Independence was strongly favored by Bosniak and Bosnian Croat voters, while Bosnian Serbs largely boycotted the referendum. The majority of voters voted for independence and on 3 March 1992 president Alija Izetbegović declared independence from Yugoslavia, which was immediately recognised by Croatia.

On 14 March there was gunfire in Mostar with the JNA barracks in the city. On the following day the citizens of Mostar set up barricades and demanded the withdrawal of the JNA forces. On 1 April there were clashes between the JNA and Croat forces in several surrounding villages and the southern suburb of Jasenica. On 8 April, Bosnian Croats were organized into the Croatian Defence Council (HVO). A sizable number of Bosniaks also joined. On 15 April, the Army of the Republic of Bosnia and Herzegovina (ARBiH) was formed, with slightly over two-thirds of troops consisting of Bosniaks and almost one-third of Croats and Serbs. The government in Sarajevo struggled to get organized and form an effective military force against the Serbs. Izetbegović concentrated all his forces on retaining control of Sarajevo. In the rest of Bosnia and Herzegovina, the government had to rely on the HVO, who had already formed their defenses, to stop the Serb advance.

== April 1992 – June 1992 siege ==
=== Prelude ===
In April fighting started at several locations in Herzegovina. The JNA's 2nd Military District, commanded by Colonel General Milutin Kukanjac, deployed elements of the 5th Banja Luka Corps and the 9th Knin Corps to the Kupres region, capturing the town from the Croatian Army (HV) and the HVO jointly defending the area in the Battle of Kupres on 7 April 1992, and threatening Livno and Tomislavgrad to the southwest. The 4th Military District of the JNA, commanded by General Pavle Strugar, employed the 13th Bileća Corps and the 2nd Titograd Corps to capture Stolac and most of the eastern bank of the Neretva River south of Mostar. The town of Široki Brijeg came under attack by the Yugoslav Air Force on 7 and 8 April.

=== Siege ===
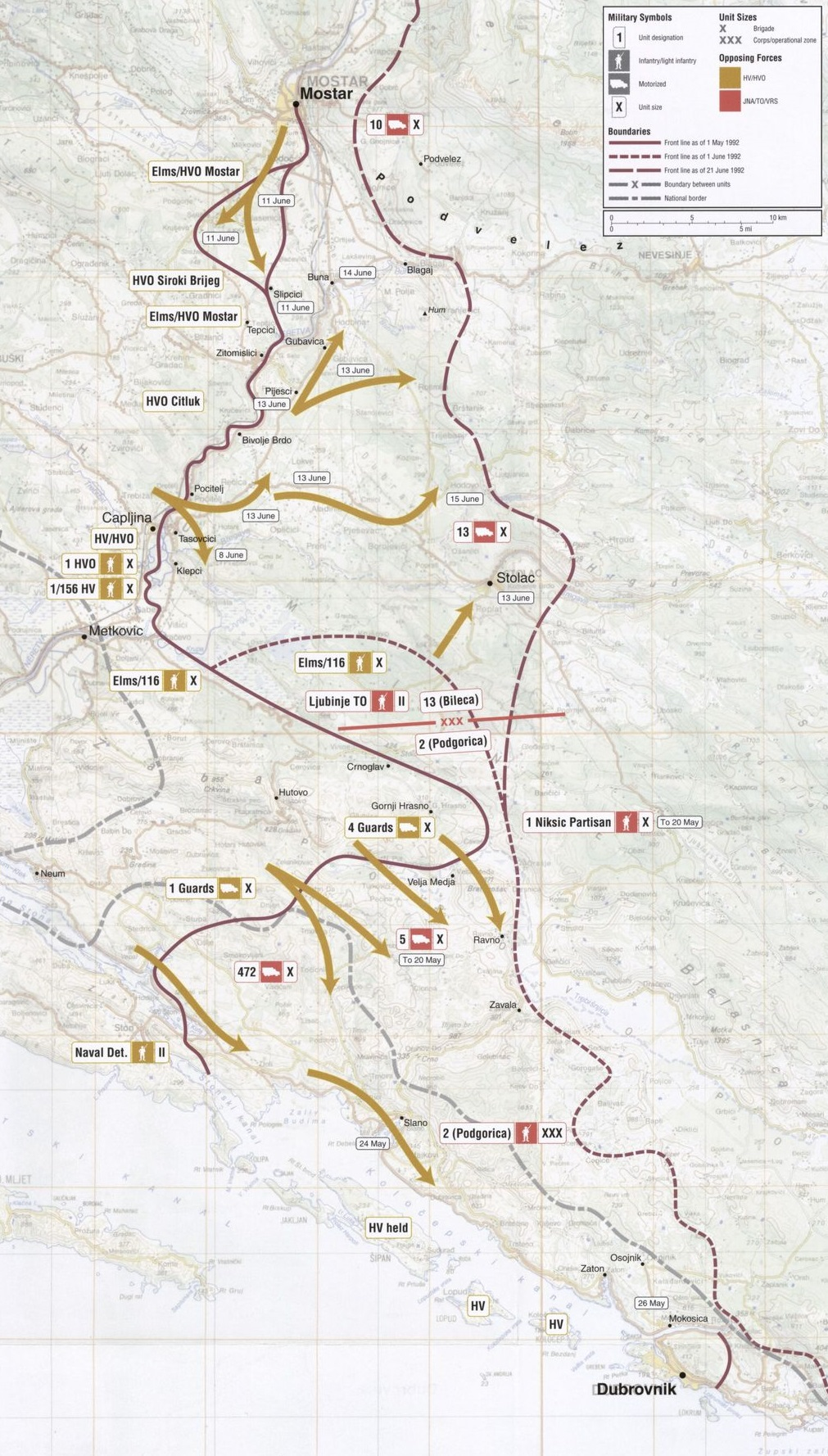
Map of Operation Jackal which brought an end to the siege in 1992

JNA artillery attacks on Mostar suburbs started on 6 April and the city was from there on periodically shelled. Over the following week the JNA gradually established control over large portions of the city. On 9 April the JNA forces repelled an attack by the Croat forces, now as part of the HVO, on the Mostar military airfield. Bosnian Serb Territorial Defence Force captured two nearby hydroelectric power plants on the Neretva River on 11 April. On 19 April 1992, General Momčilo Perišić, the commander of the 13th Bileća Corps in Mostar, ordered the artillery units to attack the neighbourhoods of Cim, Ilići, Bijeli Brijeg and Donja Mahala. JNA forces in Mostar numbered at 17,000 soldiers.

In February 1992, in the first of many meetings, Boban, Josip Manolić, Tuđman's aide and previously the Croatian Prime Minister, and Radovan Karadžić, president of the self-proclaimed Republika Srpska, met in Graz, Austria to discuss the partition of Bosnia and Herzegovina and the necessary population transfers. On 6 May, Karadžić and Boban, without Bosniak representatives, met again in Graz and formed an agreement for a ceasefire and on the territorial division of Bosnia and Herzegovina. The agreement didn't include Mostar: the Bosnian Serbs maintained that eastern Mostar should be in the Serbian administrative unit, while the Bosnian Croats considered that all of Mostar should be in the Croatian one, based on the 1939 borders of the Banovina of Croatia. The parties ultimately parted ways and on the following day the JNA and Bosnian Serb forces, later renamed to Army of Republika Srpska (VRS), mounted an attack on Croat-held positions on the eastern river bank. Apart from a narrow band on the eastern bank of the Neretva, the Croats held Bijelo Polje to the northeast. The JNA held positions on the hills overlooking the city from the east, the Hum Hill south of the city, several suburbs to the south and a portion of area to the north.

The Croatian Army planned an offensive against the JNA and VRS codenamed Operation Jackal. The objective of the operation was to relieve Mostar and break the JNA encirclement of the besieged Dubrovnik. The preparations for the operation were done by HV general Janko Bobetko. Bobetko reorganized the HVO command structure. In late May the HVO forces began a series of attacks on the JNA and VRS positions around Mostar. On 23 May the HVO captured the Hum Mountain. Operation Jackal commenced on 7 June when HV/HVO force moved east and north from Čapljina towards Stolac and Mostar. In support of the main attack, the HVO attacked VRS positions on the west bank of the Neretva and on 11 June took the Orlovac Mountain and the villages of Varda, Čule and Kruševo to the southwest and Jasenica and Slipčići to the south. By the following day the HVO pushed all remaining VRS forces east of the Neretva River. On 13 June the Serb forces destroyed two bridges across the Neretva, leaving only the Stari Most bridge, which was, however, damaged.

Meanwhile, the HV/HVO force rapidly advanced and reached the suburbs of Mostar on 14 June. By 15 June HVO consolidated its hold of Stolac and the 4th Battalion of the Mostar HVO captured JNA "Sjeverni logor" barracks in Mostar. In order to complete a link up with the advancing HV and HVO units that were advancing to the north through Buna and Blagaj, the Mostar HVO forces, supported by the HV's 4th Battalion of the 4th Guards Brigade, moved south from the city through Jasenica. The two advancing forces met at the Mostar International Airport on 17 June. The HVO cleared the Bijelo Polje neighborhood in the northeast and advanced further east along the slopes of the Velež Mountain. After the withdrawal of VRS from eastern Mostar, the Serbs were expelled from the city. By 21 June the VRS was completely pushed out of Mostar. The ARBiH supported the eastward push from the city only in a secondary role. HVO was at the time composed of both Croats and Bosniaks. Although the frontline was still close to Mostar, the high ground directly overlooking Mostar on the eastern bank of the Neretva was secured by the HV and HVO forces. The HVO began establishing control of Mostar and upon takeover Boban dismissed Bosniaks from public life and in their place put HDZ hardliners, erected roadblocks around the city, and limited the freedom of movement of Bosniaks inside and outside Mostar.

=== Aftermath ===
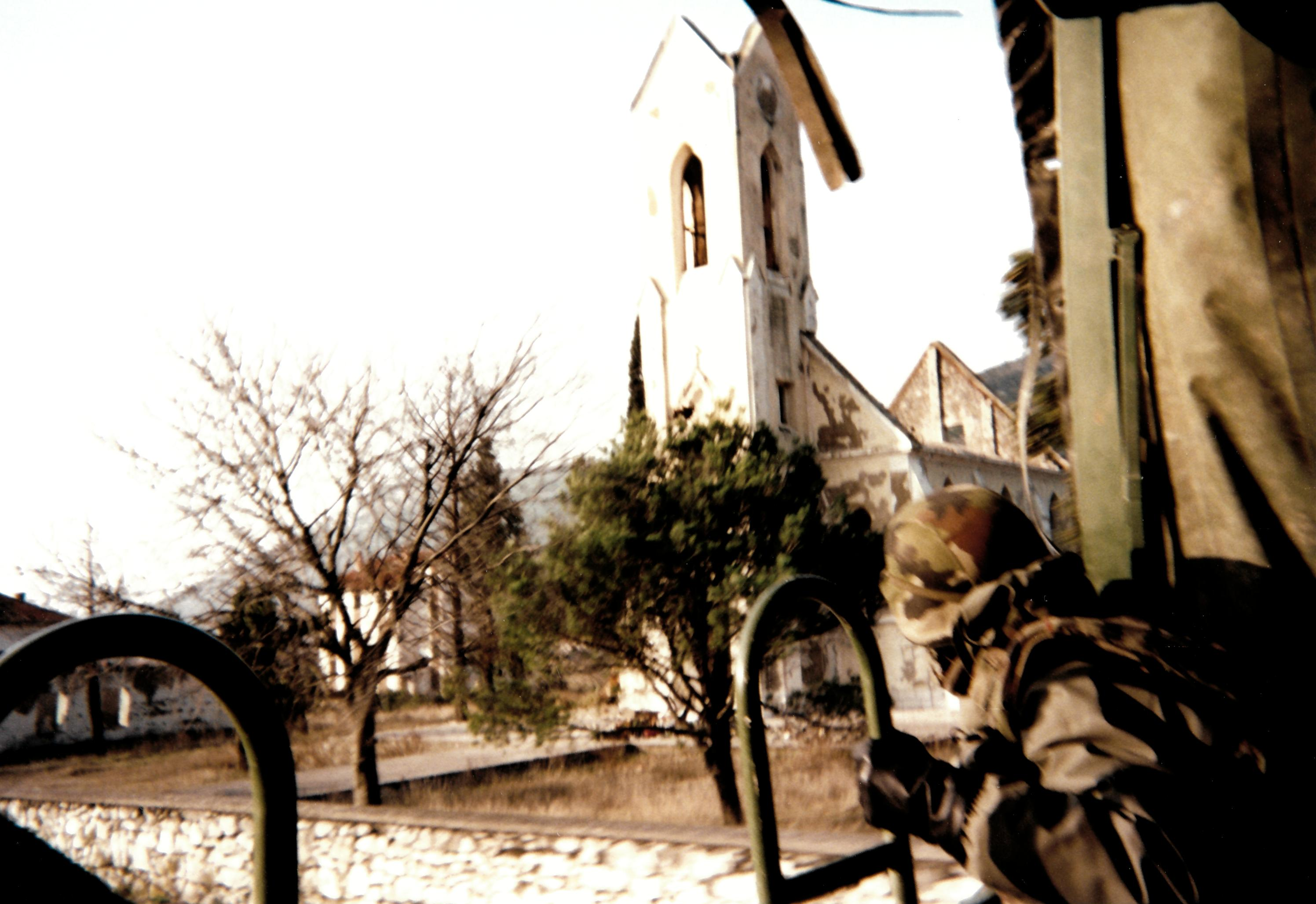
The Catholic church in Potoci near Mostar, destroyed in May 1992

Mostar was heavily damaged by JNA shelling during the siege. Amongst the destroyed or severely damaged buildings were the Catholic Cathedral of Mary, Mother of the Church, the Franciscan Church and Monastery, the Bishop's Palace (with a library collection of over 50,000 books), 12 out of 14 mosques, the historical museum, archives, and number of other cultural institutions. All of the city's bridges were destroyed, leaving only the Stari Most bridge as the remaining river crossing. In mid-June 1992, after the battle line moved eastward, the HVO demolished the Serbian Orthodox Žitomislić Monastery, while the Cathedral of the Holy Trinity was burned by an unidentified group. The JNA was accused of harassing non-Serbs and looting/burning the property of Bosniaks and Croats. About 90,000 of Mostar's 120,000 residents fled. Thousands of Bosniaks that left Mostar during the siege began to return into the city. They were followed by many Bosniak refugees from other Bosnian towns which had been overrun by the VRS.

In opinion polls conducted in Serbia during the 2000s by the Belgrade Center for Human Rights and Strategic Marketing Group less than 20 percent of respondents believed that the JNA actually besieged Mostar.

== June 1993 – April 1994 siege ==
=== Prelude ===
Although originally on friendly terms, relations between the two allies had begun to deteriorate by the latter half of 1992. The Croatian government played a "double game" in Bosnia and Herzegovina and "a military solution required Bosnia as an ally, but a diplomatic solution required Bosnia as a victim". Tuđman's branch of the Croatian Democratic Union of Bosnia and Herzegovina (HDZ BiH) held important positions in the Bosnian government, including the premiership and the Ministry of Defence, but despite this it carried out a separate policy and refused to integrate the HVO into the ARBiH. Jerko Doko, the Bosnian defence minister, gave the HVO priority in the acquisition of military weapons. In January 1992, Tuđman had arranged for Stjepan Kljuić, president of the Croatian Democratic Union of Bosnia and Herzegovina (HDZ BiH) who favored cooperating with the Bosniaks towards a unified Bosnian state, to be ousted and replaced by Mate Boban, who favored Croatia to annex Croat-inhabited parts of Bosnia and Herzegovina. A rift existed in the party between Croats from ethnically mixed areas of central and northern Bosnia and those from Herzegovina. There were also regional lobbies with diverging interests within the Bosniak Party of Democratic Action (SDA), which included Sarajevo, Central Bosnia, Herzegovina, Bosanska Krajina and Sandžak.

Izetbegović came under intense pressure from Tuđman to agree for Bosnia and Herzegovina to be in a confederation with Croatia; however, Izetbegović wanted to prevent Bosnia and Herzegovina from coming under the influence of Croatia or Serbia. Because doing so would cripple reconciliation between Bosniaks and Serbs, make the return of Bosniak refugees to eastern Bosnia impossible and for other reasons, Izetbegović opposed. He received an ultimatum from Boban warning that if he did not proclaim a confederation with Tuđman that Croatian forces would not help defend Sarajevo from strongholds as close as 40 kilometres (25 mi) away. Beginning in June, discussions between Bosniaks and Croats over military cooperation and possible merger of their armies started to take place. The Croatian government recommended moving ARBiH headquarters out of Sarajevo and closer to Croatia and pushed for its reorganization in an effort to heavily add Croatian influence.

In June and July, Boban increased pressure "by blocking delivery of arms that the Sarajevo government, working around a United Nations (UN) embargo on all shipments to the former Yugoslavia, has secretly bought." On 3 July 1992, the Croatian Community of Herzeg-Bosnia was formally declared, in an amendment to the original decision from November 1991. It claimed power over its own police, army, currency, and education and extended its grasp to many districts where Bosniaks were the majority. It only allowed a Croat flag to be used, the only currency allowed was the Croatian kuna, its official language was Croatian, and a Croat school curriculum was enacted. Mostar, where Bosniaks constituted a slight majority, was set as the capital. On 21 July, Izetbegović and Tuđman signed the Agreement on Friendship and Cooperation between Bosnia and Herzegovina and Croatia in Zagreb, Croatia. The agreement allowed them to "cooperate in opposing [the Serb] aggression" and coordinate military efforts. It placed the HVO under the command of the ARBiH. Cooperation was inharmonious, but enabled the transportation of weapons to ARBiH through Croatia in spite of the UN sanctioned arms embargo, reopening channels blocked by Boban.

In the summer of 1992, the HVO started to purge its Bosniak members and many left for ARBiH seeing that Croats had separatist goals. As the Bosnian government began to emphasize its Islamic character, Croat members left the ARBiH to join the HVO or were expelled. In late September, Izetbegović and Tuđman met again and attempted to create military coordination against the VRS, but to no avail. By October, the agreement had collapsed and afterwards Croatia diverted delivery of weaponry to Bosnia and Herzegovina by seizing a significant amount for itself and Boban had abandoned a Bosnian government alliance. From October 1992, the Army of the Republic of Bosnia and Herzegovina (ARBiH), reinforced by Mujahideen volunteers from several Islamic countries, engaged in combat against the Croatian Defence Council (HVO), which was supported by the Croatian Army. At this point the Croat-Bosniak conflict reached the point of prolonged artillery fire by both sides. At the time the HVO had a strength of 45,000 while the ARBiH had a strength of 80,500. ARBiH however was very under-equipped and even by the end of 1993 could only supply 44,000 troops with firearms. By November, Croatian forces controlled around 20 percent of Bosnia and Herzegovina. As escalation continued the Zagreb government deployed HV units and Ministry of the Interior (MUP RH) special forces into Bosnia and Herzegovina. Božo Raić, the defence minister of the Croatian Republic of Herzeg-Bosnia and an HDZ BiH member, blamed the Serbian government for the rift and asked the Bosniak side to "sober up".

After the departure of JNA and VRS forces in Mostar, tensions between Croats and Bosniaks increased. By mid-April 1993, it had become a divided city with the western part dominated by HVO forces and the eastern part where the ARBiH was largely concentrated. The 4th Corps of the ARBiH was based in eastern Mostar and under the command of Arif Pašalić. The HVO Southeast Herzegovina was under the command of Miljenko Lasić. The Croat–Bosniak War had already been raging in central Bosnia, but the worst of it was to come in Mostar. In April there were several deaths from sniper fire in Mostar. A truce was agreed by the two sides that didn't last long. By the end of the April the Croat-Bosniak war fully broke out. On 21 April, Gojko Šušak, the Croatian defence minister, met with Lord Owen in Zagreb. Šušak expressed his anger at the behavior of Bosniaks and said that two Croat villages in eastern Herzegovina have put themselves into Serb hands rather than risking coming under Bosniak control.

=== 9 May attack ===
Fighting started in the early hours of 9 May 1993. Both the east and west side of Mostar came under artillery fire. However, the evidence remains very divided with respect to how the attack of 9 May 1993 started. On the eve of 9 May, both the HVO and the ARBiH were preparing for a potential attack. Observers of the international community all stated that the HVO had started the attack on 9 May 1993. The attack sparked outrage at the UN. UNPROFOR Commander General Lars-Eric Wahlgren called it "a major Croat attack". Members of the ARBiH stated that the HVO launched an attack on the ARBiH. According to the HVO, the ARBiH attacked the HVO-held Tihomir Mišić barracks, also known as Sjeverni logor (North Camp), on the morning of 9 May. Nonetheless, there are no orders confirming that either the HVO or the ARBiH launched an attack on 9 May 1993.

In the trial against the Bosnian Croat leadership the ICTY concluded that: "On 9 May 1993, the HVO launched a major attack on the ABiH in Mostar, during which it took the Vranica building complex where the headquarters of the ABiH was located. During this operation that lasted several days, HVO soldiers blew up the Baba Besir mosque. HVO soldiers conducted mass arrests of Muslims in West Mostar and separated the men from the women, children and elderly persons. The men belonging to the ABiH were detained in the Ministry of the Interior building and at the 'Tobacco Institute' where they were savagely beaten. Other men - some belonging to the ABiH and others not - were detained and beaten at the Faculty of Mechanical Engineering. Ten ABiH soldiers died as a result of the violence exerted upon them. The women, children and elderly persons of West Mostar were sent to the Heliodrom where they were held for several days before being able to return home."

The HVO expelled Bosniaks in areas of Mostar that it controlled or sent them to camps in Dretelj, Heliodrom, Gabela, and Ljubuški where they were starved, tortured, and killed. The HVO became passive on all fronts with the VRS or collaborated with them. The exception was in Orašje, Usora, and Bihać where an alliance with the ARBiH was kept. Tuđman dismissed senior HV officers opposed to a war with the ARBiH and Janko Bobetko was appointed the Croatian chief of staff.

=== Escalation of the conflict ===
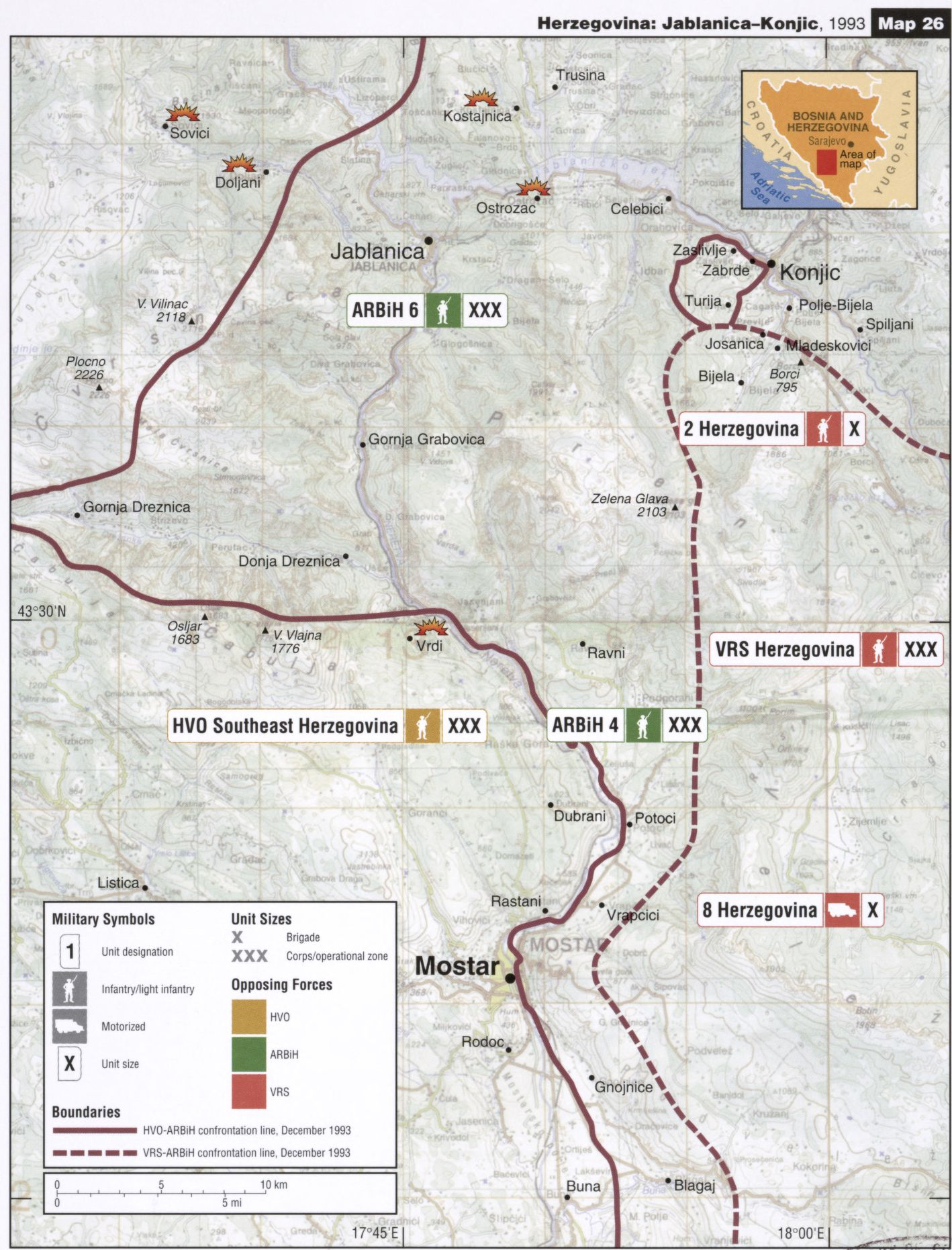
The front lines in northern and central Herzegovina in late 1993

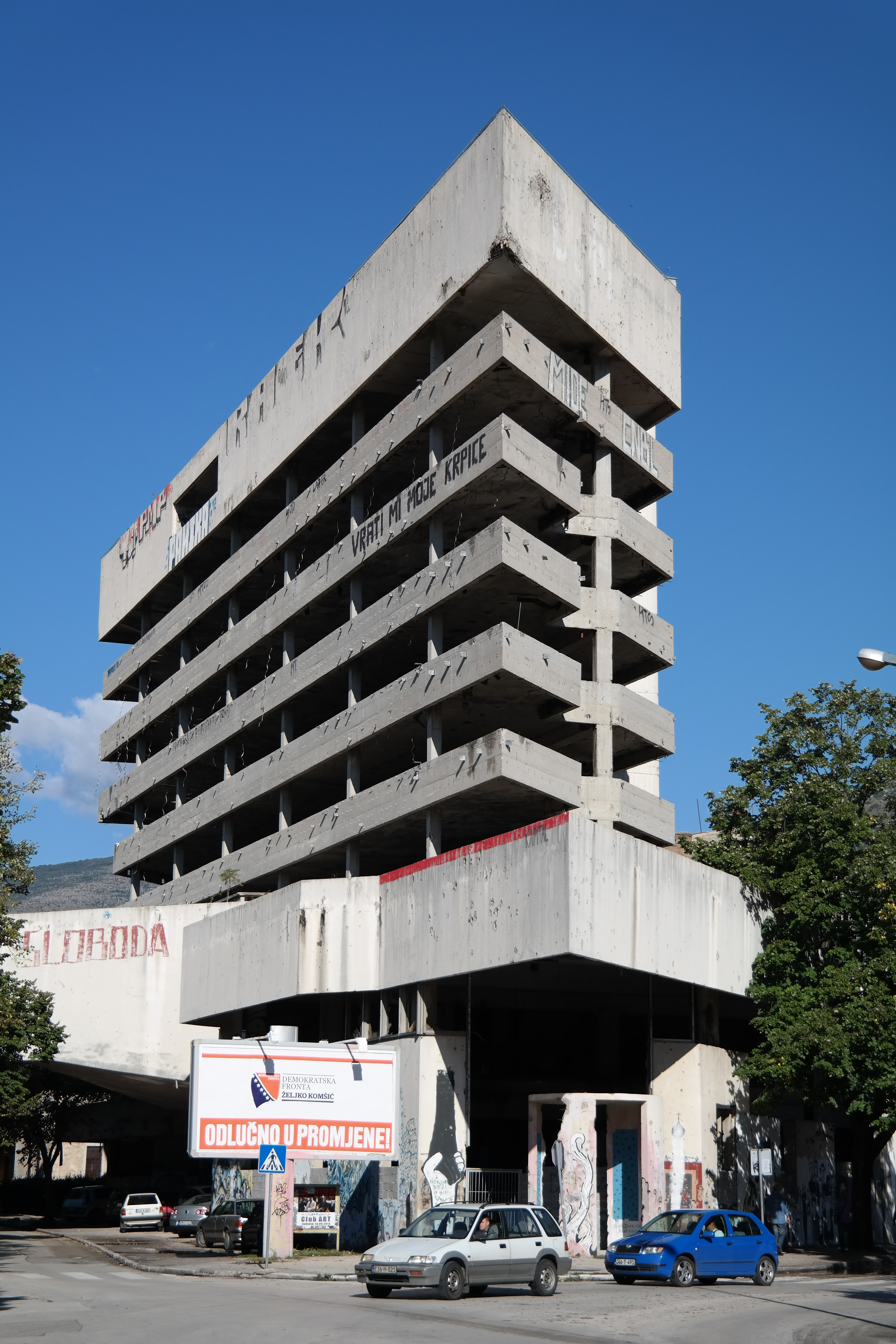
The shell of the Ljubljanska Bank building; a notorious snipers nest

The main combat locations on 9 May were the HVO-held Tihomir Mišić barracks and the ARBiH headquarters in western Mostar in the basement of a building complex referred to as Vranica. The building was heavily shelled on 9 May and HVO seized it the next day. 10 Bosniak POWs from the building were later killed. Fierce street battles were fought in the following days. On 13 May, HVO commander Milivoj Petković and ARBiH commander Sefer Halilović signed a ceasefire agreement. However, battles in the city continued. On 16 May the HVO seized a small strip of territory on the right bank of the Neretva. The situation calmed down on 21 May and the two sides remained deployed on the frontlines.

By early June, the HVO controlled a considerable portion of Mostar. The HVO had five brigades, a Special Forces regiment, and around five military police battalions. These forces were also supported by those in the towns of southwest Herzegovina including Ljubuški, Čitluk, and Čapljina. In contrast the 4th Corps of ARBiH only had the 41st Mostar Brigade under direct Mostar command. The 4th Corps had in total around 4,000 men organized into four brigades. In early 1993, the HVO Main Staff put the ration strength of the HVO in its Operative Zone Southeast Herzegovina at 6,000 officers and men.

On 30 June the ARBiH captured the Tihomir Mišić barracks on the east bank of the Neretva, a hydroelectric dam on the river and the main northern approaches to the city. The ARBiH also took control over the Vrapčići neighborhood in northeastern Mostar. Thus they secured the entire eastern part of the city. On 13 July the ARBiH mounted another offensive and captured Buna and Blagaj, south of Mostar, in the Battle of Buna and Blagaj. Two days later fierce fighting took place across the frontlines for control over northern and southern approaches to Mostar. The HVO launched a counterattack and recaptured Buna. The ARBiH was unable to repeat its victories in central Bosnia against the HVO and drive the Croat forces out entirely. In the western part of the city HVO remained in control. They then expelled the Bosniak population from western Mostar, while thousands of men were taken to improvised camps, most of them at a former heliport near the village of Dretelj, south of Mostar. The ARBiH held Croat prisoners in detention facilities in the village of Potoci, north of Mostar, and at the Fourth elementary school camp in Mostar. Both sides settled down and turned to shelling and sniping at each other, though the HVO superior heavy weaponry caused severe damage to eastern Mostar.

Between June 1993 and April 1994 the HVO besieged the eastern side of Mostar. The ICTY found that "during this period, East Mostar and the neighbourhood of Donja Mahala in the west were subjected to a prolonged military assault by the HVO, including intense and uninterrupted gunfire and shelling. This firing and shelling caused many casualties, including the deaths of many civilians and representatives of international organisations. Ten mosques were badly damaged or destroyed. The HVO impeded and at times even completely cut off the passage of humanitarian aid. The Muslim population was thus forced to live in extremely harsh conditions, deprived of food, water, electricity and adequate care. Many women, including one 16-year-old girl, were raped by HVO soldiers before being forced across the front line to East Mostar." Over 100,000 shells were launched into East Mostar by the HVO.

During the Croat-Bosniak conflict, the Serbs, who were still the strongest force, cooperated with both Bosniaks and Croats, pursuing a local balancing policy and allying with the weaker side. In the broader Mostar area the Serbs provided military support for the Bosniak side. The VRS artillery stopped firing at the ARBiH held eastern Mostar and shelled HVO positions on the hills overlooking Mostar.

In September 1993 the ARBiH launched an operation known as Operation Neretva '93 against the HVO in order to break through to the southern Neretva valley and defeat the HVO in Herzegovina. Coordinated attacks were launched on HVO positions in the area. The focus of the attack was the HVO stronghold of Vrdi north of Mostar, but HVO managed to repel the attack. The ARBiH and HVO forces had clashes in Mostar and its Bijelo Polje and Raštani suburbs. The ARBiH made some limited gains by attacking outward from the city in three directions. The HVO responded with artillery shelling of the eastern part of the city on 23 September and an ineffective counterattack on 24 September. The use of artillery by the ARBiH and HVO further damaged the city, but neither side made significant gains. After several days of negotiations, a cease-fire was agreed on 3 October. Dozens of Croat civilians were killed in villages north of Mostar during the operation. On 22 October, Tuđman instructed Šušak and Bobetko to continue to support Herzeg-Bosnia, believing that "the future borders of the Croatian state are being resolved there."

=== Destruction of the Stari Most Bridge ===
After the end of the JNA siege, the Stari Most was the last bridge connecting the two banks of the Neretva River. The ARBiH held positions in the immediate vicinity of the bridge and it was used by the ARBiH between May and November 1993 for combat activities on the front line and also by the inhabitants of the right and left banks of the Neretva as a means of communication and supply. The Stari Most bridge was shelled by the HVO beginning in June 1993, and on 8 November an HVO tank started firing on the bridge until it crumbled into the Neretva river on 9 November.

At a meeting on 10 November with the Herzeg-Bosnia leadership, Tuđman asked who destroyed the bridge. The leadership denied responsibility, Boban responded that "it was fired on so much before, and there were terrible rains, that it collapsed on its own", while Prlić said their men could not reach the bridge. Tuđman was concerned with limiting the reaction of the international community and media. The Croatian state-owned daily newspaper Vjesnik blamed "the world that didn't do anything to stop the war", while Croatian Radiotelevision blamed the Bosniaks. The destruction put into virtually total isolation the Bosniak enclave of Donja Mahala on the right bank of the Neretva. A few days later the HVO destroyed the Kamenica makeshift bridge, constructed by the ARBiH in March 1993. The ICTY in the Prlić et al. case concluded that the bridge was a legitimate military target for the HVO, but that its destruction caused disproportionate damage to the Bosniak civilian population of Mostar. Presiding judge Jean-Claude Antonetti issued a separate opinion and said that "an analysis of the video footage did not make it possible for the Chamber to determine beyond reasonable doubt who caused the final collapse of the Stari Most."

=== Washington Agreement ===
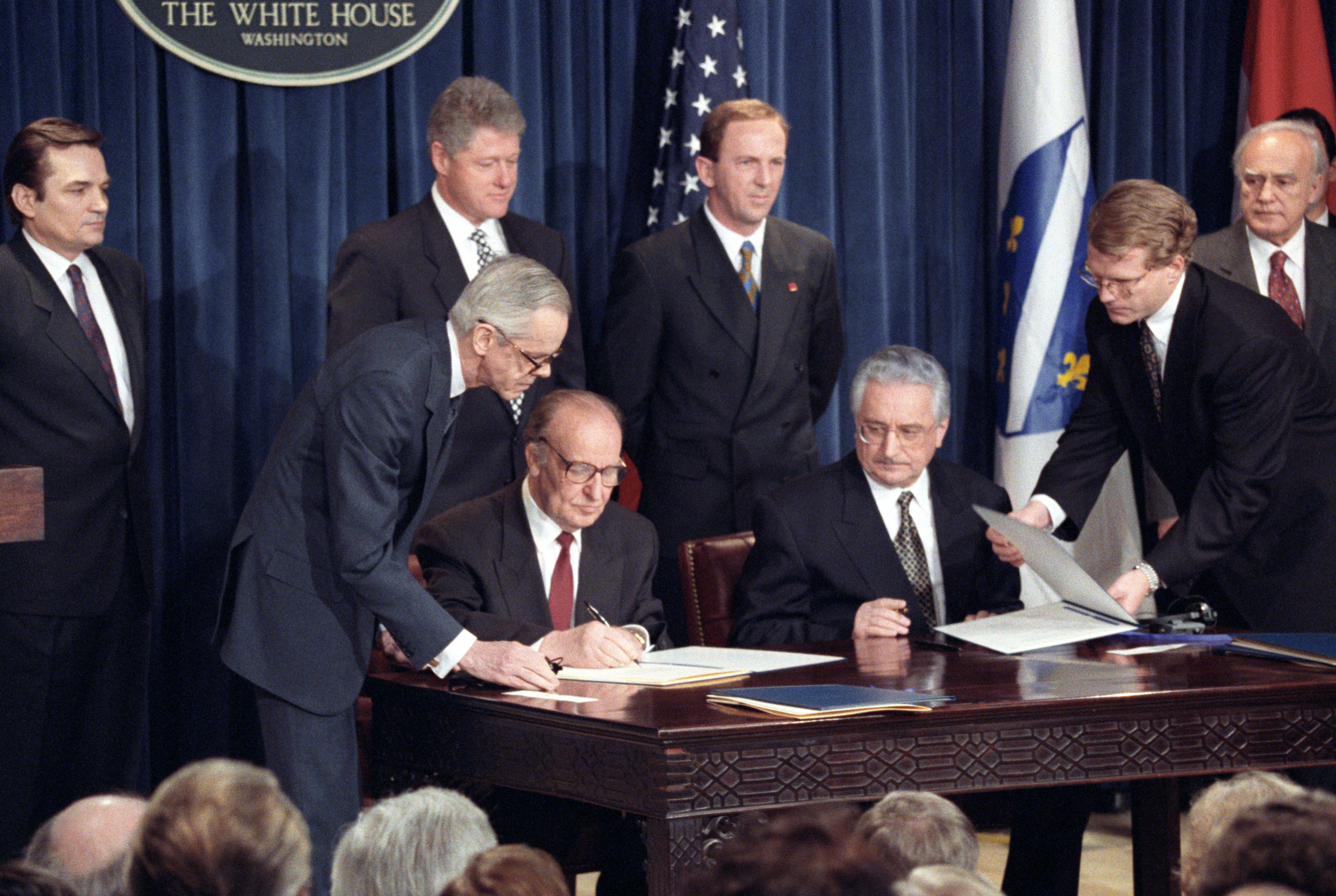
Franjo Tuđman and Alija Izetbegović signing the Washington Agreement in 1994

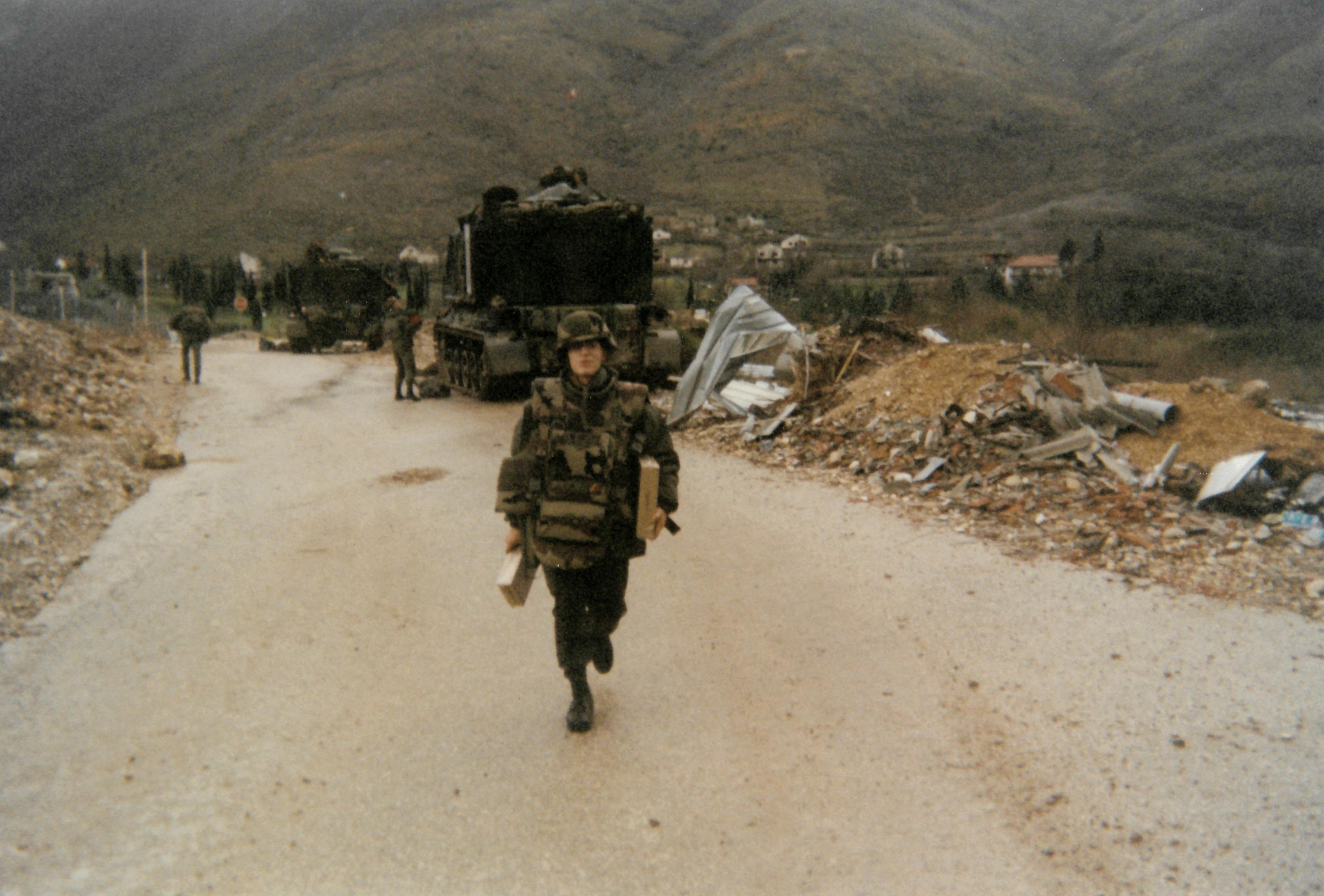
French Implementation Force (IFOR) Artillery Detachment, stationed in Mostar in 1995

In September 1993 an attempt at reconciliation of the Croat and Bosniak sides was sunk by continued fighting in central Bosnia and Mostar and by the fact that the Bosniaks were at the time not interested in peace. In summer 1993 Tuđman and Milošević proposed their own plans for a loose union of three republics. Izetbegović said he would agree on it on the condition that the Bosniak unit comprise at least 30 percent of Bosnia and Herzegovina and have access to the Sava River and the Adriatic Sea. The Serb side was only willing to accept 24 percent and the plan didn't go through. In January 1994, Izetbegović provided Tuđman with two different partition plans for Bosnia and Herzegovina and both were rejected.

By February 1994, the Secretary-General of the UN reported that between 3,000 and 5,000 Croatian regular troops were in Bosnia and Herzegovina, and the UN Security Council condemned Croatia, warning that if it didn't end "all forms of interference" there would be "serious measures" taken. The Bosnian government put the figure at 20,000, calling it an invasion. In the same month, Boban and HVO hardliners were removed from power, while "criminal elements" were dismissed from ARBiH.

On 26 February talks began in Washington, D.C. between the Bosnian government leaders and Mate Granić, Croatian Minister of Foreign Affairs to discuss the possibilities of a permanent ceasefire and a confederation of Bosniak and Croat regions. By this time the amount of territory of Bosnia and Herzegovina controlled by the HVO had dropped from 20 percent to 10 percent. Under strong American pressure, a provisional agreement on a Croat-Bosniak Federation was reached in Washington on 1 March. On 18 March, at a ceremony hosted by US President Bill Clinton, Bosnian Prime Minister Haris Silajdžić, Croatian Foreign Minister Mate Granić and President of Herzeg-Bosnia Krešimir Zubak signed the ceasefire agreement. The agreement was also signed by Bosnian President Alija Izetbegović and Croatian President Franjo Tuđman, effectively ending the Croat-Bosniak War. Under the agreement, the combined territory held by the Croat and Bosnian government forces was divided into ten autonomous cantons.

Though the HVO had an armaments advantage, the battle of Mostar ended indecisively and the city was divided into two parts based on ethnic lines. Mostar came under EU administration for an interim two-year period during which it was to be reintegrated as "a single, self-sustaining and multi-ethnic administration." On 23 May the UN established a freedom of movement agreement in the region of Mostar, but residents of the city of Mostar still could not travel between east and west. Both agreements were protested in west Mostar by Croat leaders. The Bishop of Mostar argued it was a Croat majority town that was a part of Catholic Herzeg-Bosnia and that EU administration was not the will of the people.

Several months after the Washington Agreement the Croatian government continued to pursue irredentism. According to a Novi list report, Ivić Pašalić, who was a key adviser to Tuđman and acted on his behalf, led a three-man delegation near Banja Luka to discuss with Karadžić the division of Bosnia and Herzegovina. In the meeting Karadžić proposed territory and population exchanges, something Tuđman was very interested in.

== Casualties, demographic shift, and destruction ==
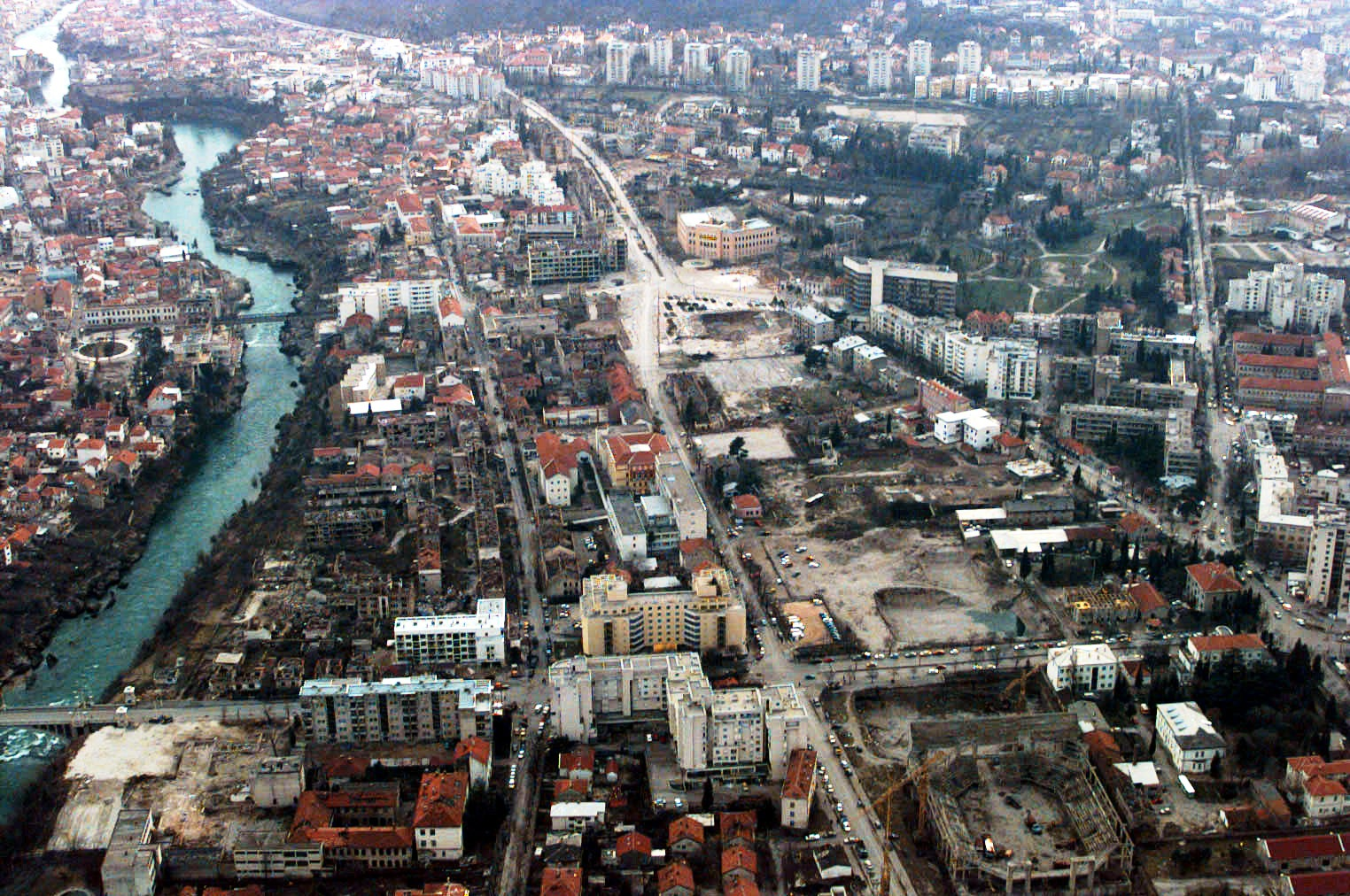
Aerial photograph of Mostar in 1997

The siege resulted in the deaths of about 2,000 individuals. According to a report by Ewa Tabeau, which was used by the ICTY, a minimum of 539 persons died in East Mostar from May 1993 until the end of the conflict. That number doesn't include 484 deaths that had an unknown place of death, but occurred during the siege. Of the 539 deaths, 49.5% were of civilians and 50.5% were of combatants.

According to the Research and Documentation Center in Sarajevo, 2,501 people died in Mostar during the entire war period, including 867 cvilians and 1,634 soldiers. Among dead civilians, 614 were Bosniaks (71%), 133 Serbs (15%), and 95 Croats (11%). Among dead soldiers, 950 were Bosniaks (58%), 411 Croats (25%), and 267 Serbs (16%).

Before the war, the Mostar municipality had a population of 43,856 Bosniaks, 43,037 Croats, 23,846 Serbs and 12,768 Yugoslavs. Mostar West, Mostar Southwest and Mostar South had a relative Croat majority, Mostar North and Mostar Old City had a relative Bosniak majority and Mostar Southeast had an absolute Bosniak majority. According to 1997 data, the municipalities that in 1991 had a Croat relative majority became all Croat and municipalities that had a Bosniak majority became all Bosniak. Due to displacement of people from other towns in Bosnia and Herzegovina during the war, east Mostar had over 30,000 displaced people from eastern Herzegovina, Stolac, Čapljina, and west Mostar. In west Mostar there were about 17,000 displaced people coming from central Bosnia, Sarajevo, Jablanica, and Konjic. In western Mostar there appears to have been an intentional Croatian government project to resettle Croats there to establish demographic and political control. The International Crisis Group observed that "the narrow Bosniak plurality of 1991 has become a substantial Croat majority".

Mostar was "the most heavily destroyed city in Bosnia and Herzegovina". The most affected area was in Bosniak populated east Mostar and the Bosniak part of west Mostar where around 60 and 75 percent of buildings were destroyed or very badly damaged. In Croat populated west Mostar around 20 percent of buildings had been severely damaged or destroyed, mostly in the western side of the Boulevar hostility line. It's estimated that 6,500 of the city's 17,500 housing units were affected.

== Reconstruction ==
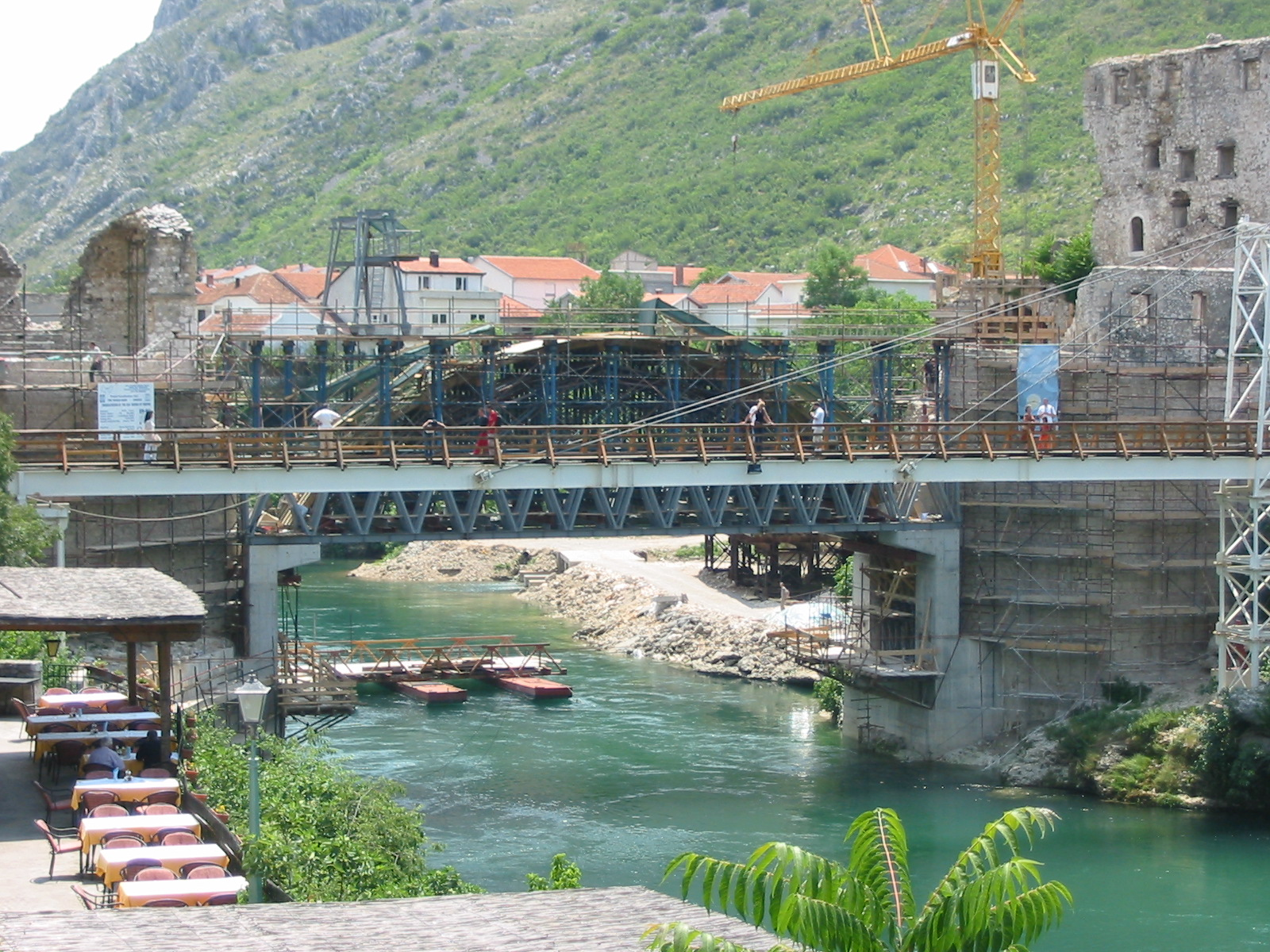
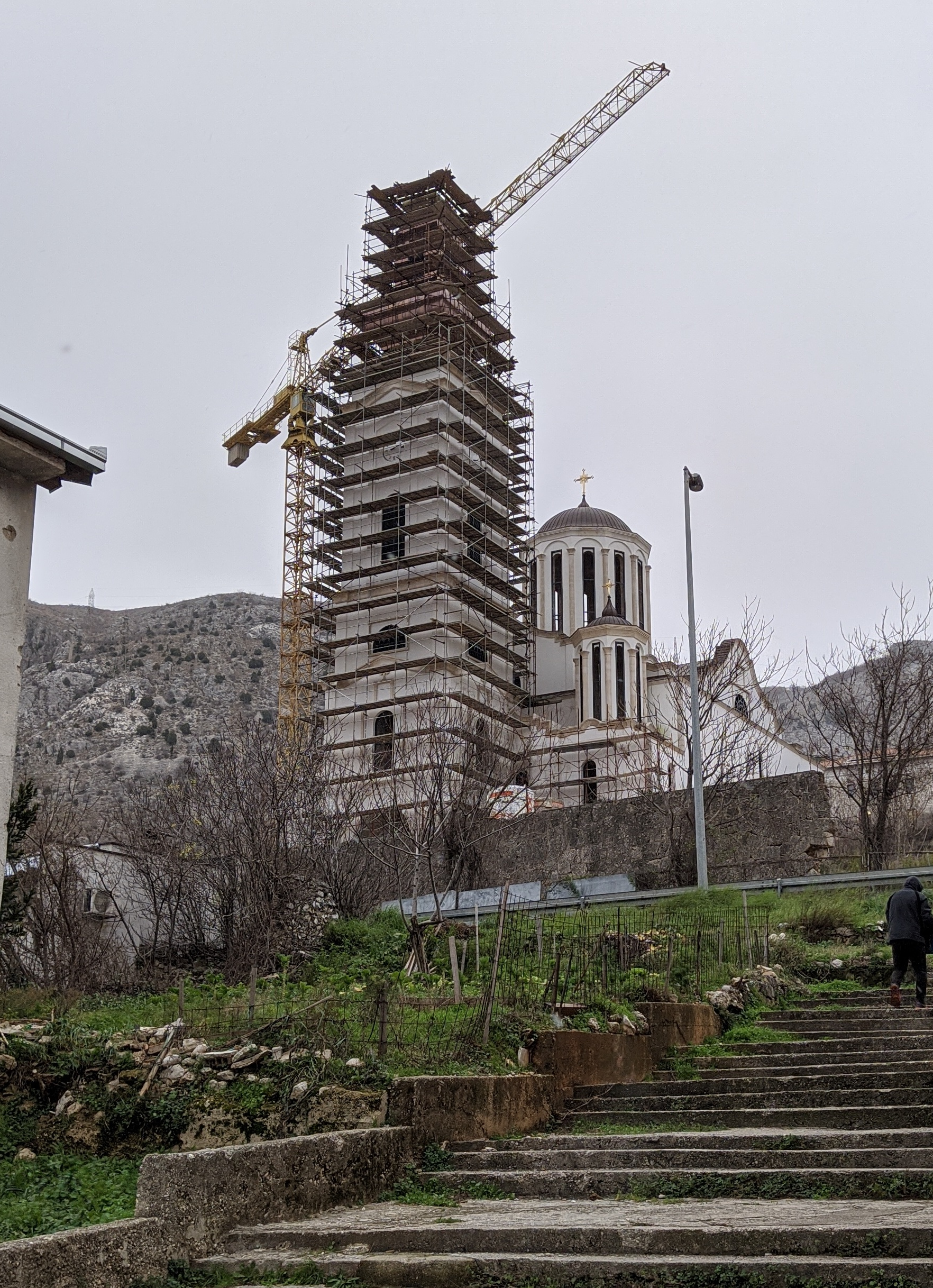
(left) The Stari Most Bridge undergoing reconstruction in 2003. (right) Serb Orthodox Cathedral, under reconstruction in 2021.

After the end of the war, plans were raised to reconstruct the bridge. The World Bank, the United Nations Educational, Scientific and Cultural Organization (UNESCO), the Aga Khan Trust for Culture and the World Monuments Fund formed a coalition to oversee the reconstruction of the Stari Most and the historic city centre of Mostar. Additional funding was provided by Italy, the Netherlands, Turkey, Croatia and the Council of Europe Development Bank, as well as the Bosnian government. In October 1998, UNESCO established an international committee of experts to oversee the design and reconstruction work. It was decided to build a bridge as similar as possible to the original, using the same technology and materials. The bridge was re-built with local materials by Er-Bu Construction Corp, a Turkish company, using Ottoman construction techniques. Tenelia stone from local quarries was used and Hungarian army divers recovered stones from the original bridge from the river below. Reconstruction commenced on 7 June 2001. The reconstructed bridge was inaugurated on 23 July 2004.

== Prosecution ==
The HVO leadership, Jadranko Prlić, Bruno Stojić, Milivoj Petković, Valentin Ćorić, Berislav Pušić and Slobodan Praljak, were convicted in 2013 in a first-instance verdict by the ICTY in relation to war crimes during the Bosnian War. In the verdict, the Chamber found that during the HVO's presence in Mostar, thousands of Bosnian Muslims and other non-Croats were expelled from the western part of the city and forced into the eastern part. ARBiH commander Sefer Halilović was indicted by the ICTY for war crimes committed during the Operation Neretva '93 and was found not guilty. In 2007, the Court of Bosnia and Herzegovina convicted eight former soldiers of the ARBiH for crimes against Croat POWs in Mostar. Four former members of the HVO were convicted in 2011 for crimes against Bosniaks in the Vojno prison. In 2014 a trial against five former ARBiH soldiers started for crimes against Croats in the village of Potoci near Mostar.

== See also ==
- Siege of Sarajevo
- Siege of Bihać
- Siege of Srebrenica
- Siege of Goražde
- Siege of Žepa
- Siege of Kotor Varoš
