= Banjdol =

- Village
- Location within Bosnia and Herzegovina
- Coordinates: 43.291°N 17.931°E
- Country: Bosnia and Herzegovina
- Entity: Federation of Bosnia and Herzegovina
- Canton: Herzegovina-Neretva
- Municipality: Mostar

Area
  - Total: 4.80 sq mi (12.43 km^{2})

Population (2013)
  - Total: 72
  - Density: 15/sq mi (5.8/km^{2})
- Time zone: UTC+1 (CET)
  - Summer (DST): UTC+2 (CEST)
- Postal code: 88000 (Same as Mostar)
- Area code: (+387) 36 345

Banjdol is a populated settlement in the Mostar municipality, Herzegovina-Neretva Canton, Federation of Bosnia and Herzegovina, Bosnia and Herzegovina. It is situated southeast of the city of Mostar.

== Demographics ==
According to the 2013 census, its population was 72, all Bosniaks.
