= Idbar =

Idbar Идбар
- Village
- Location within Bosnia and Herzegovina
- Coordinates: 43°38′50″N 17°53′01″E
- Country: Bosnia and Herzegovina
- Entity: Federation of Bosnia and Herzegovina
- Canton: Herzegovina-Neretva
- Municipality: Konjic

Area
  - Total: 18.90 sq mi (48.95 km^{2})

Population (2013)
  - Total: 235
  - Density: 12.4/sq mi (4.80/km^{2})
- Time zone: UTC+1 (CET)
  - Summer (DST): UTC+2 (CEST)

Idbar (Cyrillic: Идбар) is a village in the municipality of Konjic, Bosnia and Herzegovina.

== Demographics ==
According to the 2013 census, its population was 235.

Ethnicity in 2013
Ethnicity	Number	Percentage
Bosniaks	228	97.0%
Croats	5	2.1%
other/undeclared	2	0.9%
Total	235	100%
