= Operation Star '94 =

Republika Srpska Army 1994 operation in Gornje Podrinje

Operacija Star '94
- Part of the Bosnian War
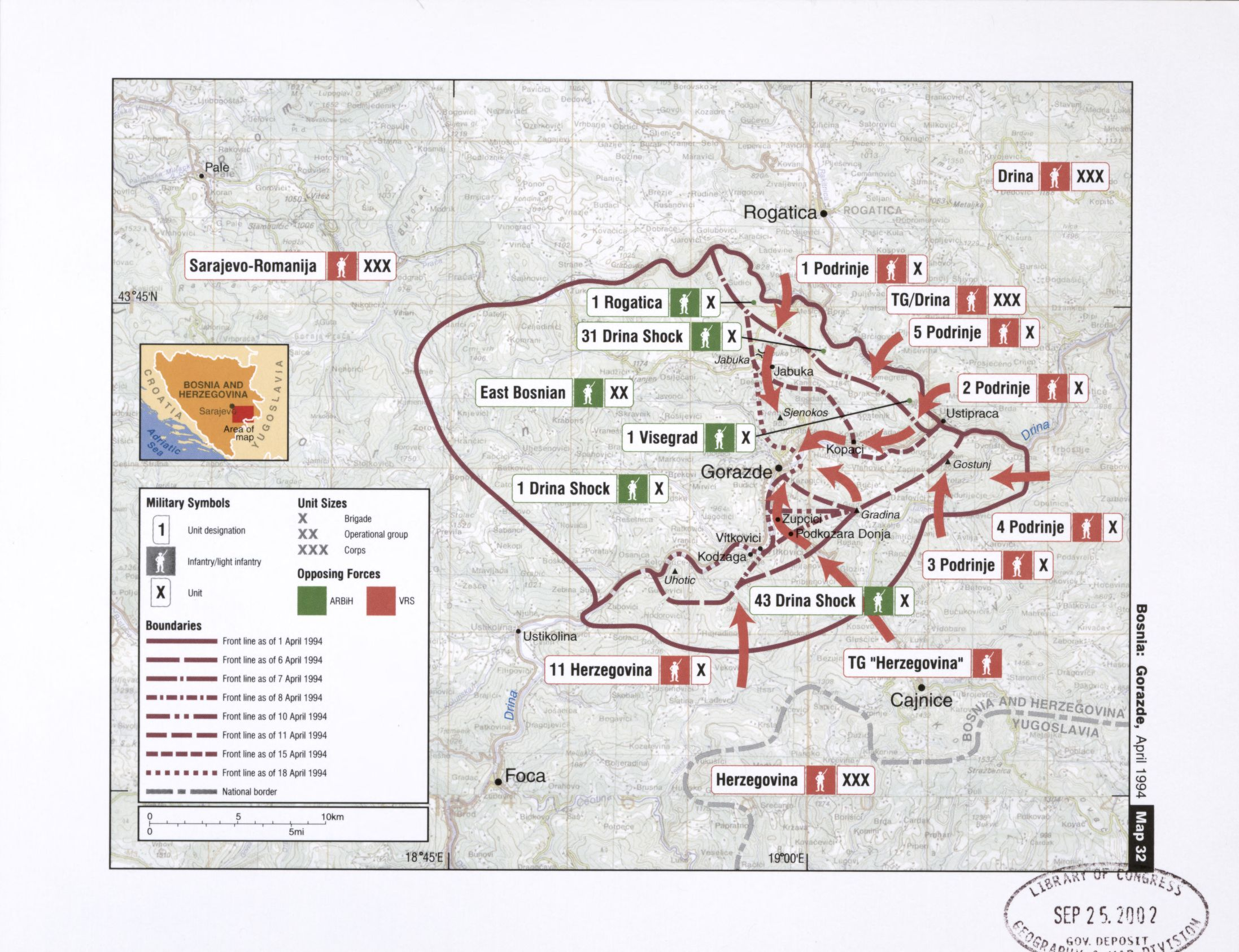
Date	April 6–18, 1994
Location	Podrinje, Bosnia and Herzegovina
Result	Army of Republika Srpska victory

Belligerents
Republika Srpska; Russian volunteers	Republic of Bosnia and Herzegovina; NATO

Commanders and leaders
(Republika Srpska) Radovan Grubač; Aleksandar Škrabov	Ferid Buljubašić

Units involved
Unknown	Unknown

Strength
13,000 – 14,000	8,000

Casualties and losses
(Republika Srpska) 100 killed (Republika Srpska) 300 wounded	300 killed 1,000 wounded

Operation Star '94 (Serbian: Operacija Zvijezda '94) is the code name for the operation of the Army of Republika Srpska (VRS) in the spring of 1994, in Gornje Podrinje. The goal of the operation was to force the political leadership of the Republic of Bosnia and Herzegovina to negotiate the signing of an armistice by capturing Goražde.

== Prelude ==
The wider area of Goražde, moving clockwise, was held by the brigades of the Sarajevo-Romanija, Drina and Herzegovina Corps. On the main, southeastern direction, there was a mixed Herzegovinian brigade (one battalion from each brigade of the Herzegovinian corps) and two brigade detachments of the Special Police Brigade; the reserve and flank were the 3rd and 4th Podrinja brigades, and the 11th Herzegovina brigade. Communication between Sarajevo and Goražde was monitored by the 7th reconnaissance-sabotage detachment. Fire support was provided by one armored battalion and two artillery divisions. The Drina tactical group, which consisted of the Rogatic, 3rd and 5th Podrinja brigades, as well as mixed-composition units drawn from other brigades of the Drina corps, attacked from the north. On the western side, the line towards the front was held by four battalions of the Sarajevo-Romanijan Corps (from Pale, Jahorina and Prača). All together, the VRS had 13,000 - 14,000 fighters at their disposal. Commanding the operation was entrusted to the commander of the Herzegovina Corps, Major General Radovan Grubac. On the other hand, Colonel Ferid Buljubasic, the commander of the East Bosnian operational group of the ARBiH, commanded about 8,000 soldiers armed mostly with infantry weapons.

== Battle ==
In the northern direction, the Drina tactical group broke through on April 7 about two kilometers deep. In the southeastern direction, the Herzegovinian tactical group managed to capture the village of Zupčići on April 8, penetrating six kilometers into the enemy's rear. In the next 5-7 days, the VRS temporarily halts the operation due to NATO airstrikes. On April 15, the operation continued, and in three days the VRS managed to break the line of defense of the ARBiH and captured the most important elevations around Goražde. The demilitarization of Goražde was agreed upon in negotiations with UNPROFOR.

== Sources ==
- Burg, Steven L.; Shoup, Paul S. (1999). The War in Bosnia-Herzegovina: Ethnic Conflict and International Intervention. M.E. Sharpe. ISBN 978-1-56324-308-0.
- Central Intelligence Agency (2002). Balkan Battlegrounds: A Military History of the Yugoslav Conflict, Volume 2. Central Intelligence Agency, Office of Russian and European Analysis.
