= Ilovača =

- Village
- Location within Bosnia and Herzegovina
- Coordinates: 43°38′N 18°49′E
- Country: Bosnia and Herzegovina
- Entity: Federation of Bosnia and Herzegovina
- Canton: Bosnian-Podrinje Goražde
- Municipality: Goražde

Area
  - Total: 0.88 sq mi (2.29 km^{2})

Population (2013)
  - Total: 171
  - Density: 193/sq mi (74.7/km^{2})
- Time zone: UTC+1 (CET)
  - Summer (DST): UTC+2 (CEST)

Ilovača is a village in the municipality of Goražde, Bosnia and Herzegovina.

== Demographics ==
According to the 2013 census, its population was 171.

Ethnicity in 2013
| Ethnicity | Number | Percentage |
|---|---|---|
| Bosniaks | 167 | 97.7% |
| Serbs | 1 | 0.6% |
| other/undeclared | 3 | 1.8% |
| Total | 171 | 100% |
