= Arif Pašalić =

Bosnian military officer (1943–1998)

- Born: August 31, 1943; Zenica, PR Bosnia and Herzegovina, FPR Yugoslavia
- Died: April 26, 1998 (aged 54); Mostar, Bosnia and Herzegovina
- Military career
- Allegiance: (Socialist Federal Republic of Yugoslavia) SFR Yugoslavia Republic of Bosnia and Herzegovina
- Commands: 4th Corps (Army of the Republic of Bosnia and Herzegovina)
- Conflicts: Bosnian War

Arif Pašalić (31 August 1943 – 26 April 1998) was a Bosnian military officer who commanded the 4th Corps of the Army of Bosnia and Herzegovina (ARBIH) during the Bosnian War.

== Early life and education ==
Pašalić was born in the hamlet of Janjići in the Zenica municipality. He enrolled in a secondary school for army officers in 1963. In 1967 he was commissioned as an officer in the Yugoslav People's Army (JNA). From 1977 until 1979 he attended the JNA staff and command college in Belgrade.

== Career ==
When the political situation in Bosnia and Herzegovina began to heat up early 1992, Pašalić was stationed in Sarajevo. He left the JNA in March 1992 with the rank of potpukovnik, the Yugoslav equivalent of lieutenant colonel.

In April 1992 Pašalić arrived in Mostar and joined the local Territorial defence (TO) formation. On 17 November 1992 Pašalić personally inaugurated the 4th Corps of the ARBIH. He commanded the 4th Corps through much of the Croat–Bosniak War. Following the end of the war in Bosnia and Herzegovina Pašalić became a top officer in the Army of the Federation of Bosnia and Herzegovina.

== Death ==
He was killed in an automobile accident near Drežnica, Mostar on 26 April 1998, aged 54.
