= Podvelež =

- Village
- Location within Bosnia and Herzegovina
- Coordinates: 43.3087608°N 17.903086°E
- Country: Bosnia and Herzegovina
- Entity: Federation of Bosnia and Herzegovina
- Canton: Herzegovina-Neretva
- Municipality: City of Mostar

Area
  - Total: 12.12 sq mi (31.39 km^{2})

Population (2013)
  - Total: 179
  - Density: 14.8/sq mi (5.70/km^{2})
- Time zone: UTC+1 (CET)
  - Summer (DST): UTC+2 (CEST)

Podvelež is a village in the City of Mostar, Bosnia and Herzegovina.

== Demographics ==
According to the 2013 census, its population was 179, all Bosniaks.
