= Srebrenica massacre =

1995 genocidal killing of Bosniak men

- Part of the Bosnian War and the Bosnian genocide
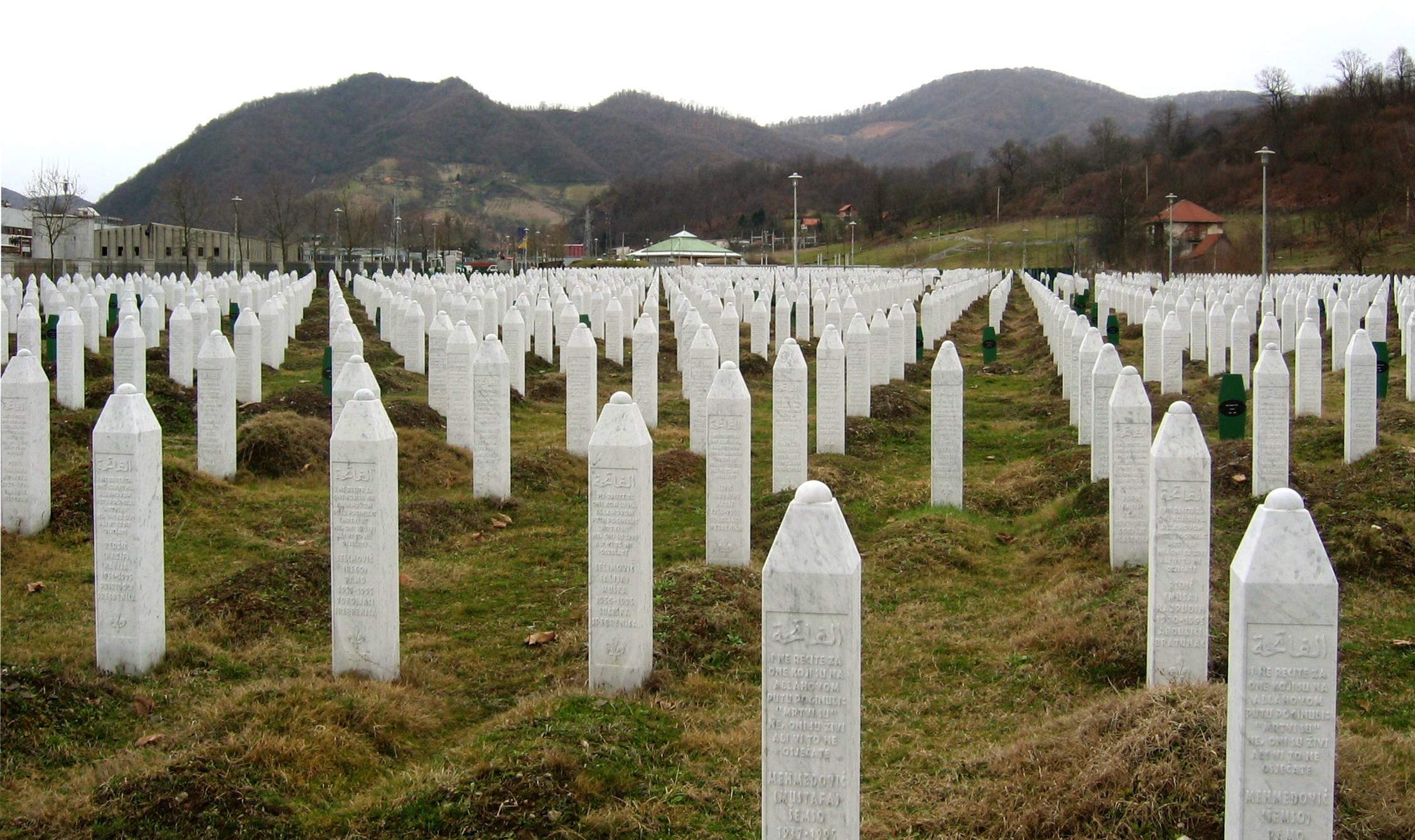
- Some of the gravestones for the nearly 7,000 identified victims buried at the Srebrenica-Potočari Memorial and Cemetery for the Victims of the 1995 genocide.

- Srebrenica (Bosnia and Herzegovina)
- Native name: Genocid u Srebrenici / Геноцид у Сребреници
- Location: 44°06′N 19°18′E; Srebrenica, Republic of Bosnia and Herzegovina
- Date: 11 July 1995 – 22 July 1995; 31 years ago
- Target: Bosniaks
- Attack type: Genocide, ethnic cleansing, genocidal massacre, genocidal rape, androcide, forced displacement
- Victims: 8,372 men and boys killed, 25,000–30,000, mainly women and children, abused and forcibly transferred
- Perpetrators: Army of Republika Srpska; Scorpions paramilitary group
- Motive: Anti-Bosniak sentiment Serbian irredentism Islamophobia; Serbianisation

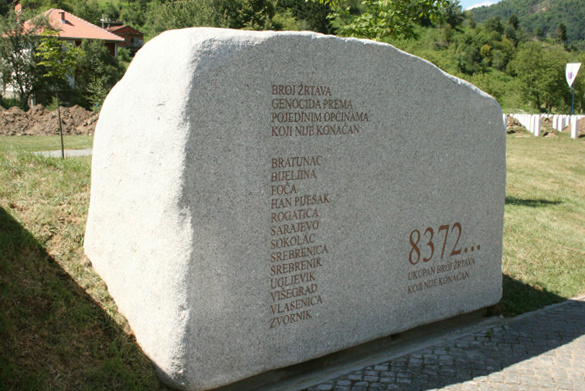
Srebrenica Genocide Memorial Stone at Potočari

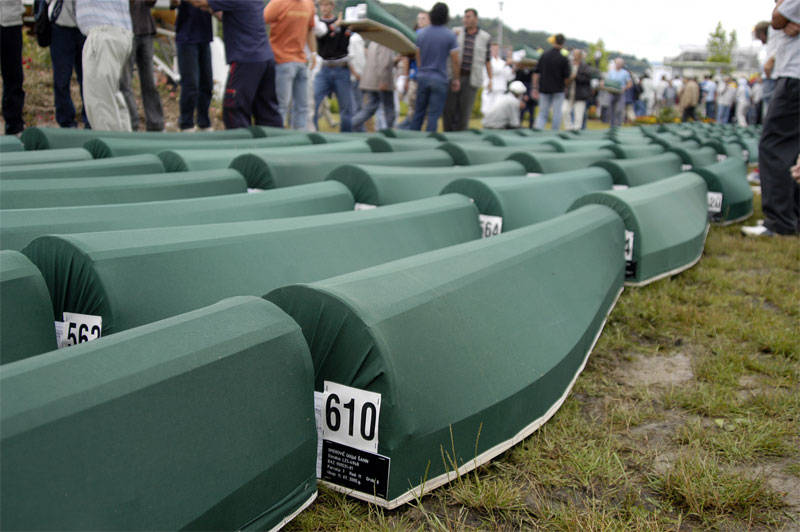
Burial of 610 identified Bosniaks in 2005

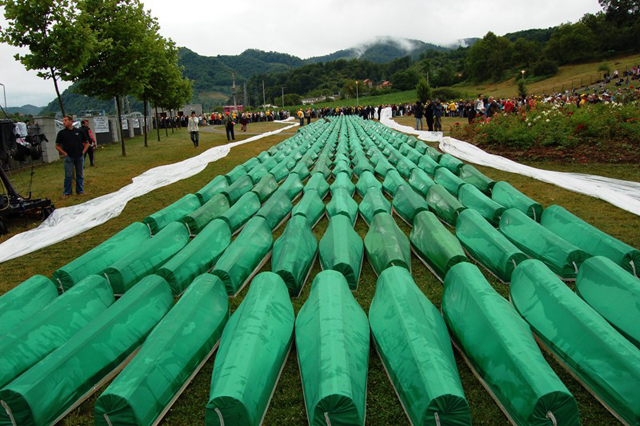
Burial of 465 identified Bosniaks in 2007

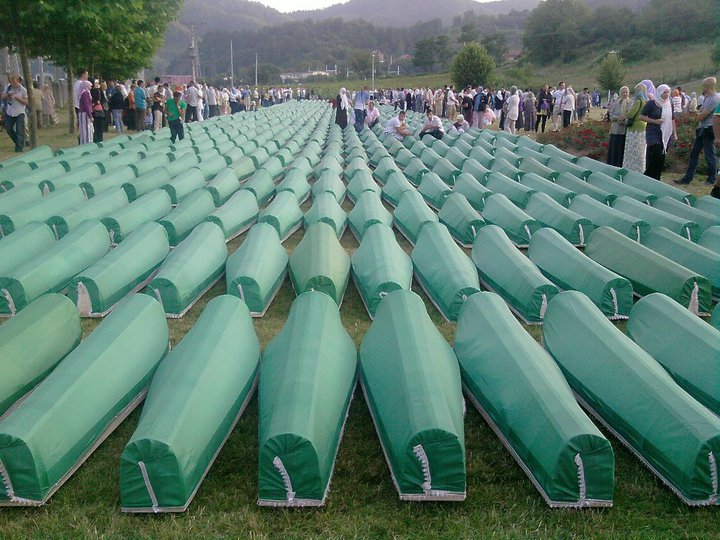
Burial of 775 identified Bosniaks in 2010

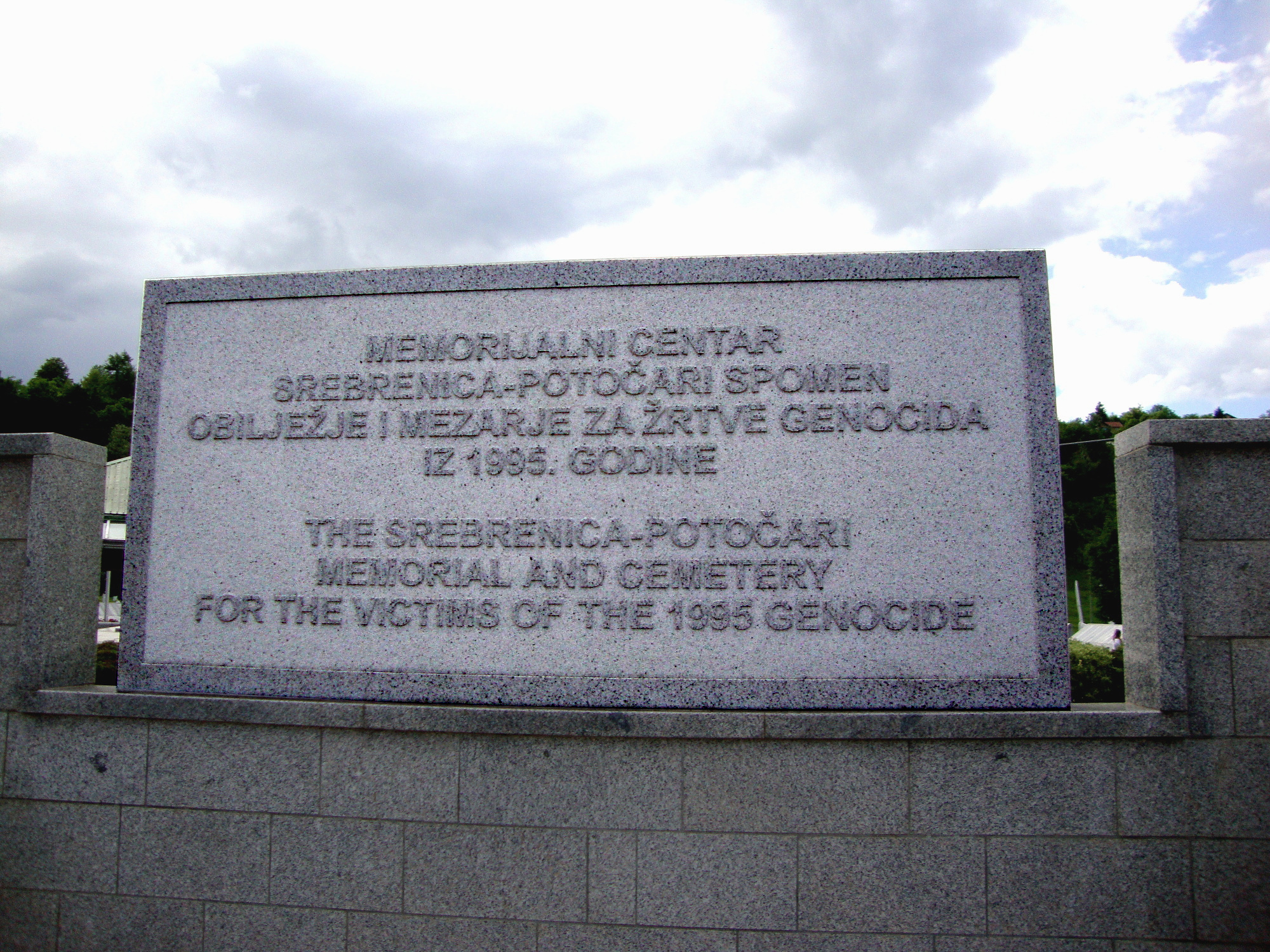
The Srebrenica-Potočari memorial, and the cemetery for the victims of the genocide.

The Srebrenica massacre, (Note: Serbo-Croatian: Masakr u Srebrenici, Масакр у Сребреници) also known as the Srebrenica genocide, (Note: Serbo-Croatian: Genocid u Srebrenici, Геноцид у Сребреници) was the July 1995 genocidal killing of more than 8,000 Bosniak men and boys in and around the town of Srebrenica during the Bosnian War. It was mainly perpetrated by units of the Bosnian Serb Army of Republika Srpska under Ratko Mladić, though the Serb paramilitary unit Scorpions also participated. In addition, 25,000 to 30,000 Bosniaks, mainly women and children, were abused and forcibly moved out of Srebrenica. The massacre constitutes the first legally recognised genocide in Europe since the end of World War II.

Before the massacre, the United Nations (UN) had declared the besieged enclave of Srebrenica a "safe area" under its protection. A UN Protection Force contingent of 370 lightly armed Dutch soldiers failed to deter the town's capture and subsequent massacre. On 13 July, peacekeepers handed over some 5,000 Muslims sheltering at the Dutch base in exchange for the release of 14 Dutch peacekeepers held by the Bosnian Serbs.

A list of people missing or killed during the massacre contains 8,372 names. The Research and Documentation Center in Sarajevo established that 83% of those killed were civilians. As of 2020, nearly 7,000 genocide victims had been identified through DNA analysis of body parts recovered from mass graves. Some Serbs have claimed the massacre was retaliation for civilian casualties inflicted on Bosnian Serbs by Bosniak soldiers from Srebrenica under the command of Naser Orić. These 'revenge' claims have been rejected and condemned by the International Criminal Tribunal for the former Yugoslavia (ICTY) and the UN.

The Appeals Chamber of the ICTY (in 2004) and the International Court of Justice (in 2007) have ruled the Srebrenica massacre constituted genocide. In 2002, the government of the Netherlands resigned, citing its inability to prevent the massacre. In 2013, 2014 and 2019, the Dutch state was found liable by its supreme court and the Hague district court, of failing to prevent more than 300 deaths. In 2013, Serbian president Tomislav Nikolić apologised for "the crime" of Srebrenica but refused to call it genocide.

In 2005, then UN Secretary-General Kofi Annan described the massacre as "a terrible crime – the worst on European soil since the Second World War", and in May 2024, the UN designated 11 July as the annual International Day of Reflection and Commemoration of the 1995 Genocide in Srebrenica.

== Background ==
=== Conflict in Eastern Bosnia and Herzegovina ===
The Socialist Republic of Bosnia and Herzegovina was inhabited by mainly Muslim Bosniaks (44%), Orthodox Serbs (31%) and Catholic Croats (17%). As the former Yugoslavia began to disintegrate, the republic declared national sovereignty in 1991 and held a referendum for independence in February 1992. The result, which favoured independence, was opposed by Bosnian Serb political representatives, who boycotted the referendum. The Republic of Bosnia and Herzegovina was formally recognised by the European Community in April 1992 and the United Nations in May 1992.

Following the declaration of independence, Bosnian Serb forces, supported by the Serbian government of Slobodan Milošević and the Yugoslav People's Army (JNA), attacked Bosnia and Herzegovina, to secure and unify the territory under Serb control, and create an ethnically homogenous Serb state of Republika Srpska. In the struggle for territorial control, the non-Serb populations from areas under Serbian control, especially the Bosniak population in eastern Bosnia, near the Serbian borders, were subject to ethnic cleansing.

=== Ethnic cleansing ===
Srebrenica, and the surrounding Central Podrinje region, had immense strategic importance to the Bosnian Serb leadership. It was the bridge to disconnected parts of the envisioned ethnic state of Republika Srpska. Capturing Srebrenica and eliminating its Muslim population would also undermine the viability of the Bosnian Muslim state.

In 1991, 73% of the population in Srebrenica were Bosnian Muslims and 25% Bosnian Serbs. Tension between Muslims and Serbs intensified in the early 1990s, as the local Serb population were provided with weapons and military equipment distributed by Serb paramilitary groups, the JNA and the Serb Democratic Party (Srpska demokratska stranka, SDS).

By April 1992, Srebrenica had become isolated by Serb forces. On 17 April, the Bosnian Muslim population was given a 24-hour ultimatum to surrender all weapons and leave town. Srebrenica was briefly captured by the Bosnian Serbs and retaken by Bosnian Muslims on 8 May 1992. Nonetheless, the Bosnian Muslims remained surrounded by Serb forces, and cut off from outlying areas. The Naser Orić trial judgment described the situation:

Between April 1992 and March 1993 ... Srebrenica and the villages in the area held by Bosnian Muslims were constantly subjected to Serb military assaults, including artillery attacks, sniper fire ... occasional bombing from aircraft. Each onslaught followed a similar pattern. Serb soldiers and paramilitaries surrounded a Bosnian Muslim village ... called upon the population to surrender their weapons, and then began with indiscriminate shelling and shooting ... they then entered the village ... expelled or killed the population, who offered no significant resistance, and destroyed their homes ... Srebrenica was subjected to indiscriminate shelling from all directions daily. Potočari, in particular, was a daily target ... because it was a sensitive point in the defence line around Srebrenica. Other Bosnian Muslim settlements were routinely attacked as well. All this resulted in a great number of refugees and casualties.

Between April and June 1992, Bosnian Serb forces, with support from the JNA, destroyed 296 predominantly Bosniak villages around Srebrenica, forcibly uprooted 70,000 Bosniaks from their homes and systematically massacred at least 3,166 Bosniaks, including women, children and elderly. In neighbouring Bratunac, Bosniaks were either killed or forced to flee to Srebrenica, resulting in 1,156 deaths. Thousands of Bosniaks were killed in Foča, Zvornik, Cerska and Snagovo.

=== 1992–1993: Struggle for Srebrenica ===
Over the remainder of 1992, offensives by Bosnian government forces from Srebrenica increased the area under their control. In July 1992 Bosnian forces attacked neighbouring Serb villages in Srebrenica and Bratunac, killing 69. By January 1993 they had linked with Bosniak-held Žepa to the south and Cerska to the west. The Srebrenica enclave had reached its peak size of 900 square kilometres (350 square miles), though it was never linked to the main area of Bosnian-government controlled land in the west and remained "a vulnerable island amid Serb-controlled territory". Army of the Republic of Bosnia and Herzegovina (ARBiH) forces under Naser Orić used Srebrenica as a staging ground to attack neighboring Serb villages inflicting many casualties. In 1993, the Serb village of Kravica was attacked by ARBiH, which resulted in Serb civilian casualties. The resistance to the Serb siege of Srebrenica, by the ARBiH under Orić, was seen as a catalyst for the massacre.

Serbs started persecuting Bosniaks in 1992. Serbian propaganda deemed Bosniak resistance to Serb attacks as a ground for revenge. According to French General Philippe Morillon, Commander of the UN Protection Force (UNPROFOR), in testimony at the ICTY in 2004:

JUDGE ROBINSON: Are you saying, then, General, that what happened in 1995 was a direct reaction to what Naser Oric did to the Serbs two years before?
THE WITNESS: [Interpretation] Yes. Yes, Your Honour. I am convinced of that. This doesn't mean to pardon or diminish the responsibility of the people who committed that crime, but I am convinced of that, yes.

Over the next few months, the Serb military captured the villages of Konjević Polje and Cerska, severing the link between Srebrenica and Žepa, and reducing the Srebrenica enclave to 150 square kilometres. Bosniak residents of the outlying areas converged on Srebrenica and its population swelled to between 50,000 and 60,000, about ten times the pre-war population. General Morillon visited Srebrenica in March 1993. The town was overcrowded and siege conditions prevailed. There was almost no running water as the advancing Serb forces had destroyed water supplies; people relied on makeshift generators for electricity. Food, medicine and other essentials were scarce. The conditions rendered Srebrenica a slow death camp. Morillon told panicked residents at a public gathering that the town was under the protection of the UN, and he would never abandon them. During March and April 1993 several thousand Bosniaks were evacuated, under the auspices of the UN High Commissioner for Refugees (UNHCR). The evacuations were opposed by the Bosnian government in Sarajevo, as contributing to the ethnic cleansing of predominantly Bosniak territory.

The Serb authorities remained intent on capturing the enclave. On 13 April 1993, the Serbs told the UNHCR representatives that they would attack the town within two days unless the Bosniaks surrendered and agreed to be evacuated.

==== Starvation ====
With the failure to demilitarize and the shortage of supplies getting in, Orić consolidated his power and controlled the black market. Orić's men began hoarding food, fuel, cigarettes and embezzled money sent by aid agencies to support Muslim orphans. Basic necessities were out of reach for many in Srebrenica due to Orić's actions. UN officials were beginning to lose patience with the ARBiH in Srebrenica and saw them as "criminal gang leaders, pimps and black marketeers".

A former Serb soldier of the "Red Berets" unit described the tactics used to starve and kill the besieged population:

It was almost like a game, a cat-and-mouse hunt. But of course, we greatly outnumbered the Muslims, so in almost all cases, we were the hunters and they were the prey. We needed them to surrender, but how do you get someone to surrender in a war like this? You starve them to death. So very quickly we realised that it wasn't really weapons being smuggled into Srebrenica that we should worry about, but food. They were truly starving in there, so they would send people out to steal cattle or gather crops, and our job was to find and kill them ... No prisoners. Well, yes, if we thought they had useful information, we might keep them alive until we got it out of them, but in the end, no prisoners ... The local people became quite indignant, so sometimes we would keep someone alive to hand over to them [to kill] just to keep them happy.

When British journalist Tony Birtley visited Srebrenica in March 1993, he took footage of civilians starving to death. The Hague Tribunal in the case of Orić concluded:

Bosnian Serb forces controlling the access roads were not allowing international humanitarian aid—most importantly, food and medicine—to reach Srebrenica. As a consequence, there was a constant and serious shortage of food, causing starvation to peak in the winter of 1992/1993. Numerous people died or were in an extremely emaciated state due to malnutrition. Bosnian Muslim fighters and their families, however, were provided with food rations from existing storage facilities. The most disadvantaged group among the Bosnian Muslims was that of the refugees, who usually lived on the streets and without shelter, in freezing temperatures. Only in November and December 1992 did two UN convoys with humanitarian aid reach the enclave, and this despite Bosnian Serb obstruction.

=== 1993–1995: Srebrenica "safe area" ===
==== UN Security Council declares Srebrenica a "safe area" ====
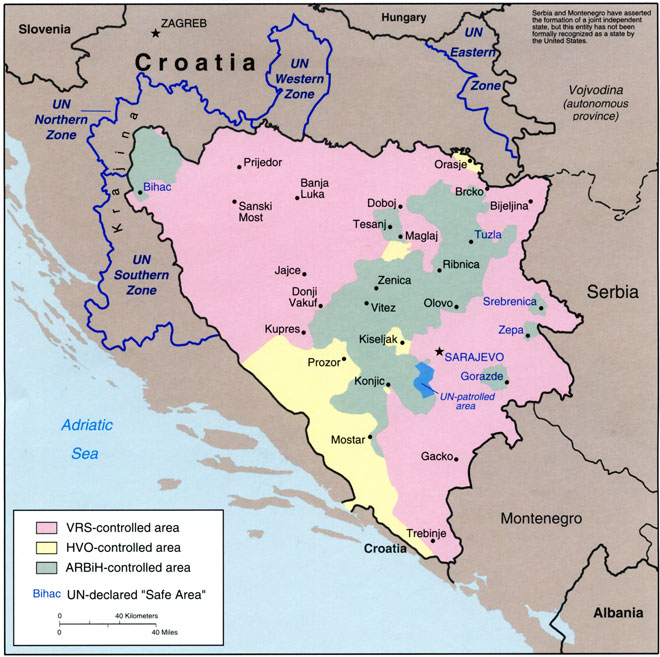
Areas of control in eastern Bosnia and Herzegovina enclaves near the Serbian border, September 1994

On 16 April 1993, the United Nations Security Council passed Resolution 819, which demanded "all parties ... treat Srebrenica and its surroundings as a safe area which should be free from any armed attack or ... hostile act". On 18 April, the first group of UNPROFOR troops arrived in Srebrenica. UNPROFOR deployed Canadian troops to protect it as one of five newly established UN "safe areas". UNPROFOR's presence prevented an all-out assault, though skirmishes and mortar attacks continued.

On 8 May 1993, an agreement was reached for demilitarization of Srebrenica. According to a UN report,

General [Sefer] Halilović and General Mladić agreed on measures covering the whole of the Srebrenica enclave and ... Žepa. ... Bosniac forces ... would hand over their weapons, ammunition and mines to UNPROFOR, after which Serb 'heavy weapons and units that constitute a menace to the demilitarised zones ... will be withdrawn.' Unlike the earlier agreement, it stated specifically that Srebrenica was to be considered a 'demilitarised zone', as referred to in the ... Geneva Conventions.

Both parties violated the agreement, though two years of relative stability followed the establishment of the enclave. Lieutenant colonel Thom Karremans (the Dutchbat Commander) testified that his personnel were prevented from returning to the enclave by Serb forces, and that equipment and ammunition were prevented from getting in. Bosniaks in Srebrenica complained of attacks by Serb soldiers, while to the Serbs it appeared Bosnian forces were using the "safe area", as a convenient base to launch counter-offensives and UNPROFOR was failing to prevent it. General Sefer Halilović admitted ARBiH helicopters had flown in violation of the no-fly zone and he had dispatched eight helicopters with ammunition for the 28th Division.

Between 1,000 and 2,000 soldiers from the VRS Drina Corps Brigades were deployed around the enclave, equipped with tanks, armoured vehicles, artillery and mortars. The 28th Mountain Division of the ARBiH in the enclave was neither well organised nor equipped, and lacked a firm command structure and communications system. Some of its soldiers carried old hunting rifles or no weapons, few had proper uniforms.

==== UN failure to demilitarise ====
A Security Council mission led by Diego Arria arrived on 25 April 1993 and, in their report to the UN, condemned the Serbs for perpetrating "a slow-motion process of genocide". The mission stated "Serb forces must withdraw to points from which they cannot attack, harass or terrorise the town." Specific instructions from UN Headquarters in New York City stated UNPROFOR should not be too zealous in searching for Bosniak weapons and the Serbs should withdraw their heavy weapons before the Bosniaks disarmed, which the Serbs never did.

Attempts to demilitarise the ARBiH and force withdrawal of the Army of Republika Srpska (RS) proved futile. The ARBiH hid most of their heavy weapons, modern equipment and ammunition in the surrounding forest and only handed over disused and old weaponry. The VRS refused to withdraw from the front lines due to intelligence they received regarding ARBiH's hidden weaponry.

In March 1994, UNPROFOR sent 600 Dutch soldiers ("Dutchbat") to replace the Canadians. By March 1995, Serb forces controlled all territory surrounding Srebrenica, preventing even UN access to the supply road. Humanitarian aid decreased and living conditions quickly deteriorated. UNPROFOR presence prevented all-out assault on the safe area, though skirmishes and mortar attacks continued. The Dutchbat alerted UNPROFOR command to the dire conditions, but UNPROFOR declined to send humanitarian relief or military support.

==== Organisation of UNPROFOR and UNPF ====
In April 1995, UNPROFOR became the name used for the Bosnia and Herzegovina regional command of the now-renamed United Nations Peace Forces (UNPF), with "12,500 British, French and Dutch troops equipped with tanks and high calibre artillery to increase the effectiveness and the credibility of the peacekeeping operation". The report states:

In the UNPROFOR chain of command, Dutchbat occupied the fourth tier, with the sector commanders occupying the third tier. The fourth tier primarily had an operational task ... Dutchbat was expected to operate as an independent unit with its own logistic arrangements. Dutchbat was dependent on the UNPROFOR organization to some extent for crucial supplies such as fuel. For the rest, it was expected to obtain its supplies from the Netherlands. From an organizational point of view, the battalion had two lifelines: UNPROFOR and the Royal Netherlands Army. Dutchbat had been assigned responsibility for the Srebrenica Safe Area. Neither UNPROFOR nor Bosnia-Hercegovina paid much attention to Srebrenica, however. Srebrenica was situated in eastern Bosnia and Herzegovina, which was geographically and mentally far removed from Sarajevo and Zagreb. The rest of the world was focused on the fight for Sarajevo ... As a Safe Area, Srebrenica only occasionally managed to attract the attention of the world press or the UN Security Council. That is why the Dutch troops there remained of secondary importance, in operational and logistic terms, for so long; and why the importance of the enclave in the battle for domination between the Bosnian Serbs and Bosnian Muslims failed to be recognised for so long.

==== Situation deteriorates ====
By early 1995, fewer and fewer supply convoys were making it through to the enclave. The situation in Srebrenica and other enclaves had deteriorated into lawless violence as prostitution among young Muslim girls, theft and black marketeering proliferated. Already meager resources dwindled further, and even the UN forces started running dangerously low on food, medicine, ammunition and fuel, eventually being forced to start patrolling on foot. Dutch soldiers who left on leave were not allowed to return, and their number dropped from 600 to 400 men. In March and April, the Dutch soldiers noticed a build-up of Serb forces.

In March 1995, Radovan Karadžić, President of Republika Srpska (RS), despite pressure from the international community to end the war and efforts to negotiate peace, issued a directive to the VRS concerning long-term strategy in the enclave. The directive, known as "Directive 7", specified the VRS was to:

Complete the physical separation of Srebrenica from Žepa as soon as possible, preventing even communication between individuals in the two enclaves. By planned and well-thought-out combat operations, create an unbearable situation of total insecurity with no hope of further survival or life for the inhabitants of Srebrenica.

By mid-1995, the humanitarian situation in the enclave was catastrophic. In May, following orders, Orić and his staff left the enclave, leaving senior officers in command of the 28th Division. In late June and early July, the 28th Division issued reports including urgent pleas for the humanitarian corridor to be reopened. When this failed, Bosniak civilians began dying from starvation. On 7 July, the mayor reported eight residents had died. On 4 June, UNPROFOR commander Bernard Janvier, a Frenchman, secretly met with Ratko Mladić to obtain the release of hostages, many of whom were French. Mladić demanded of Janvier that there would be no more airstrikes.

In the weeks leading up to the assault on Srebrenica by the VRS, ARBiH forces were ordered to carry out diversion and disruption attacks on the VRS by the high command. On one occasion on 25 June, ARBiH forces attacked VRS units on the Sarajevo–Zvornik road, inflicting high casualties and looting VRS stockpiles.

==== 6–11 July 1995: Serb takeover ====
The Serb offensive against Srebrenica began in earnest on 6 July. The VRS, with 2,000 soldiers, were outnumbered by the defenders and did not expect the assault to be an easy victory. Five UNPROFOR observation posts in the south of the enclave fell in the face of the Bosnian Serb advance. Some Dutch soldiers retreated into the enclave after their posts were attacked, the crews of the other observation posts surrendered into Serb custody. The defending Bosnian forces numbering 6,000 came under fire and were pushed back towards the town. Once the southern perimeter began to collapse, about 4,000 Bosniak residents, who had been living in a Swedish housing complex for refugees nearby, fled north into Srebrenica. Dutch soldiers reported the advancing Serbs were "cleansing" the houses in the south of the enclave.

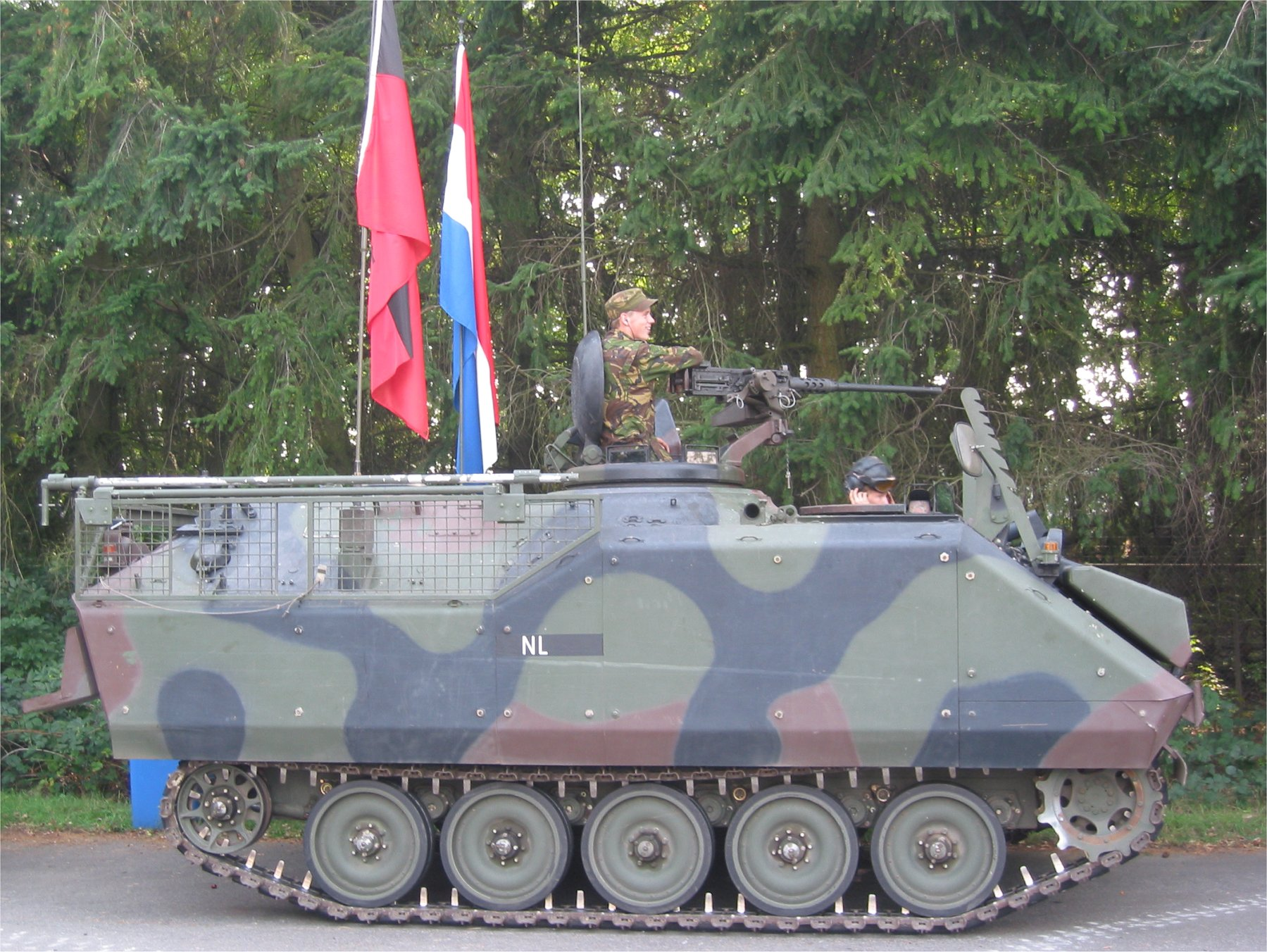
A Dutch YPR-765 of the type used at Srebrenica

On 8 July, a Dutch YPR-765 armoured vehicle took fire from the Serbs and withdrew. A group of Bosniaks demanded the vehicle stay to defend them, and established a makeshift barricade to prevent its retreat. As the vehicle withdrew, a Bosniak farmer manning the barricade threw a grenade onto it and killed Dutch soldier Raviv van Renssen. On 9 July, emboldened by success, little resistance from the demilitarised Bosniaks and lack of reaction from the international community, President Karadžić issued a new order authorising the 1,500-strong VRS Drina Corps to capture Srebrenica.

The following morning, 10 July, Lieutenant Colonel Karremans made urgent requests for air support from NATO to defend Srebrenica as crowds filled the streets, some of whom carried weapons. VRS tanks were approaching, and NATO airstrikes on these began on 11 July. NATO bombers attempted to attack VRS artillery locations outside the town, but poor visibility forced NATO to cancel this. Further air attacks were cancelled after VRS threats to bomb the UN's Potočari compound, kill Dutch and French military hostages and attack surrounding locations where 20,000 to 30,000 civilian refugees were situated. 30 Dutchbat soldiers were taken hostage by Mladić's troops.

Late in the afternoon of 11 July, General Mladić, accompanied by General Živanović (Commander of the Drina Corps), General Krstić (Deputy Commander of the Drina Corps) and other VRS officers, took a triumphant walk through the deserted streets of Srebrenica. In the evening, Lieutenant Colonel Karremans was filmed drinking a toast with Mladić during the bungled negotiations on the fate of the civilian population grouped in Potočari.

== Massacre ==
The two highest-ranking Serb politicians from Bosnia and Herzegovina, Karadžić and Momčilo Krajišnik, both indicted for genocide, were warned by VRS commander Mladić (found guilty of genocide in 2017) that their plans could not be realized without committing genocide. Mladić said at a parliamentary session of 12 May 1992:

People are not little stones or keys in someone's pocket, that can be moved from one place to another just like that. ... Therefore, we cannot precisely arrange for only Serbs to stay in one part of the country while removing others painlessly. I do not know how Mr. Krajišnik and Mr. Karadžić will explain that to the world. That is genocide.

=== Increasing concentration of refugees in Potočari ===
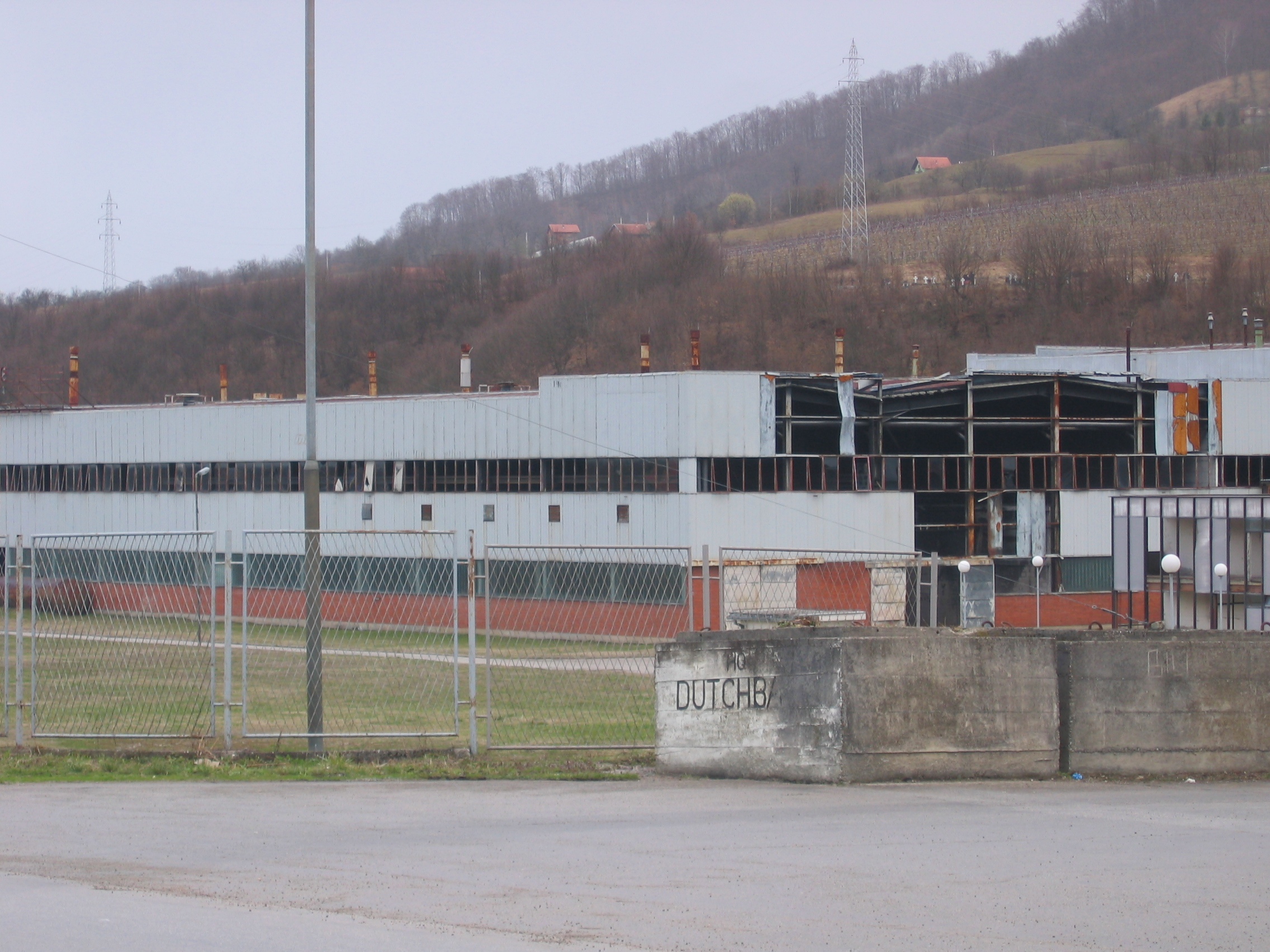
Headquarters in Potočari for soldiers under United Nations command; "Dutchbat" had 370 soldiers in Srebrenica during the massacre. The building was a disused battery factory.

By the evening of 11 July, approximately 20,000–25,000 Bosniak refugees from Srebrenica were gathered in Potočari, seeking protection within the UNPROFOR Dutchbat headquarters. Several thousand had pressed inside the compound, while the rest were spread throughout neighbouring factories and fields. Though most were women, children, elderly or disabled, 63 witnesses estimated there were at least 300 men inside the compound and between 600 and 900 in the crowd outside.

Conditions included "little food or water" and sweltering heat. A UNPROFOR Dutchbat officer described the scene:

They were panicked, they were scared, and they were pressing each other against the soldiers, my soldiers, the UN soldiers that tried to calm them. People who fell were trampled on. It was a chaotic situation.

On 12 July, the UN Security Council, in Resolution 1004, expressed concern at the humanitarian situation in Potočari, condemned the offensive by Bosnian Serb forces and demanded immediate withdrawal. On 13 July, the Dutch forces expelled five Bosniak refugees from the compound despite knowing men outside were being killed.

=== Crimes committed in Potočari ===
On 12 July, the refugees in the compound could see VRS members setting houses and haystacks on fire. Throughout the afternoon, Serb soldiers mingled in the crowd and summary executions of men occurred. In the morning of 12 July, a witness saw a pile of 20–30 bodies heaped up behind the Transport Building, alongside a tractor-like machine. Another testified he saw a soldier slay a child with a knife, in the middle of a crowd of expellees. He said he saw Serb soldiers execute over 100 Bosniak men behind the Zinc Factory, then load their bodies onto a truck, though the number and nature of the murders contrasted with other evidence in the Trial Record, which indicated killings in Potočari were sporadic in nature. Soldiers were picking people out of the crowd and taking them away. A witness recounted how three brothers – one a child, the others in their teens – were taken out in the night. When the boys' mother went looking for them, she found them naked and with their throats slit.

That night, a Dutchbat medical orderly witnessed two Serb soldiers raping a woman. A survivor, Zarfa Turković, described the horrors: "Two [Serb soldiers] took her legs and raised them in the air, while the third began raping her. Four of them were taking turns on her. People were silent, and no one moved. She was screaming and yelling and begging them to stop. They put a rag into her mouth, and then we just heard silent sobs."

==== Murder of Bosniak men and boys in Potočari ====
From the morning of 12 July, Serb forces began gathering men and boys from the refugee population in Potočari and holding them in separate locations, and as the refugees began boarding the buses headed north towards Bosniak-held territory, Serb soldiers separated men of military age who were trying to clamber aboard. Occasionally, younger and older men were stopped as well (some as young as 14). These men were taken to a building referred to as the "White House". By the evening of 12 July, Major Franken of Dutchbat heard that no men were arriving with the women and children, at their destination in Kladanj. UNHCR Director of Operations Peter Walsh was dispatched to Srebrenica by Chief of Mission, Damaso Feci, to evaluate what emergency aid could be provided rapidly. Walsh and his team arrived at Gostilj, just outside Srebrenica, in the afternoon only to be turned away by VRS forces. Despite claiming freedom of movement rights, the UNHCR team was not allowed to proceed and forced to head back north to Bijeljina. Throughout, Walsh relayed reports back to UNHCR in Zagreb about the unfolding situation, including witnessing the enforced movement and abuse of Muslim men and boys, and the sound of executions taking place.

On 13 July, Dutchbat troops witnessed definite signs Serb soldiers were murdering Bosniak men who had been separated. Corporal Vaasen saw two soldiers take a man behind the "White House", heard a shot and saw the two soldiers reappear alone. Another Dutchbat officer saw Serb soldiers murder an unarmed man with a gunshot to the head, and heard gunshots 20–40 times an hour throughout the afternoon. When the Dutchbat soldiers told Colonel Joseph Kingori, a United Nations Military Observer (UNMO) in the Srebrenica area, that men were being taken behind the "White House" and not coming back, Kingori went to investigate. He heard gunshots as he approached, but was stopped by Serb soldiers before he could find out what was going on.

Some executions were carried out at night under arc lights, and bulldozers then pushed the bodies into mass graves. According to evidence collected from Bosniaks by French policeman Jean-René Ruez, some were buried alive; he heard testimony describing Serb forces killing and torturing refugees, streets littered with corpses, people committing suicide to avoid having their noses, lips and ears chopped off, and adults being forced to watch soldiers kill their children.

==== Rape and abuse of civilians ====
Thousands of women and girls suffered rape and sexual abuse and torture. According to the testimony of Zumra Šehomerović:

The Serbs began at a certain point to take girls and young women out of the group of refugees. They were raped. The rapes often took place under the eyes of others and sometimes even under the eyes of the children of the mother. A Dutch soldier stood by and he simply looked around with a Walkman on his head. He did not react at all to what was happening. It did not happen just before my eyes, for I saw that personally, but also before the eyes of us all. The Dutch soldiers walked around everywhere. It is impossible that they did not see it.

There was a woman with a small baby a few months old. A Chetnik told the mother that the child must stop crying. When the child did not stop crying, he snatched the child away and cut its throat. Then he laughed. There was a Dutch soldier there who was watching. He did not react at all.

I saw yet more frightful things. For example, there was a girl, who must have been about nine years old. At a certain moment, some Chetniks recommended to her brother that he rape the girl. He did not do it and I also think that he could not have done it for he was still just a child. Then they murdered that young boy. I have personally seen all that. I really want to emphasize that all this happened in the immediate vicinity of the base. In the same way, I also saw other people who were murdered. Some of them had their throats cut. Others were beheaded.

Testimony of Ramiza Gurdić:

I saw how a young boy of about ten was killed by Serbs in Dutch uniform. This happened in front of my own eyes. The mother sat on the ground and her young son sat beside her. The young boy was placed on his mother's lap. The young boy was killed. His head was cut off. The body remained on the lap of the mother. The Serbian soldier placed the head of the young boy on his knife and showed it to everyone. ... I saw how a pregnant woman was slaughtered. There were Serbs who stabbed her in the stomach, cut her open and took two small children out of her stomach and then beat them to death on the ground. I saw this with my own eyes.

Testimony of Kada Hotić:

There was a young woman with a baby on the way to the bus. The baby cried and a Serbian soldier told her that she had to make sure that the baby was quiet. Then the soldier took the child from the mother and cut its throat. I do not know whether Dutchbat soldiers saw that. ... There was a sort of fence on the left-hand side of the road to Potocari. I heard then a young woman screaming very close by (4 or 5 meters away). I then heard another woman beg: "Leave her, she is only nine years old." The screaming suddenly stopped. I was so in shock that I could scarcely move. ... The rumour later quickly circulated that a nine-year-old girl had been raped.

That night, a Dutchbat medical orderly came across two Serb soldiers raping a young woman:

[W]e saw two Serb soldiers, one of them was standing guard and the other one was lying on the girl, with his pants off. And we saw a girl lying on the ground, on some kind of mattress. There was blood on the mattress, even she was covered with blood. She had bruises on her legs. There was even blood coming down her legs. She was in total shock. She went totally crazy.

Bosnian Muslim refugees nearby could see the rape, but could do nothing about it because of Serb soldiers standing nearby. Other people heard women screaming, or saw women being dragged away. Several individuals were so terrified that they committed suicide by hanging themselves. Throughout the night and early the next morning, stories about the rapes and killings spread through the crowd and the terror in the camp escalated.

Screams, gunshots and other frightening noises were audible throughout the night and no one could sleep. Soldiers were picking people out of the crowd and taking them away: some returned; others did not.

==== Deportation of women ====
As a result of exhaustive UN negotiations with Serb troops, around 25,000 women from Srebrenica were forcibly transferred to Bosniak-controlled territory. Some buses apparently never reached safety. According to a witness account by Kadir Habibović, who hid himself on one of the first buses from the base in Potočari to Kladanj, he saw at least one vehicle full of Bosniak women being driven away from Bosnian government-held territory.

=== Column of Bosniak men ===
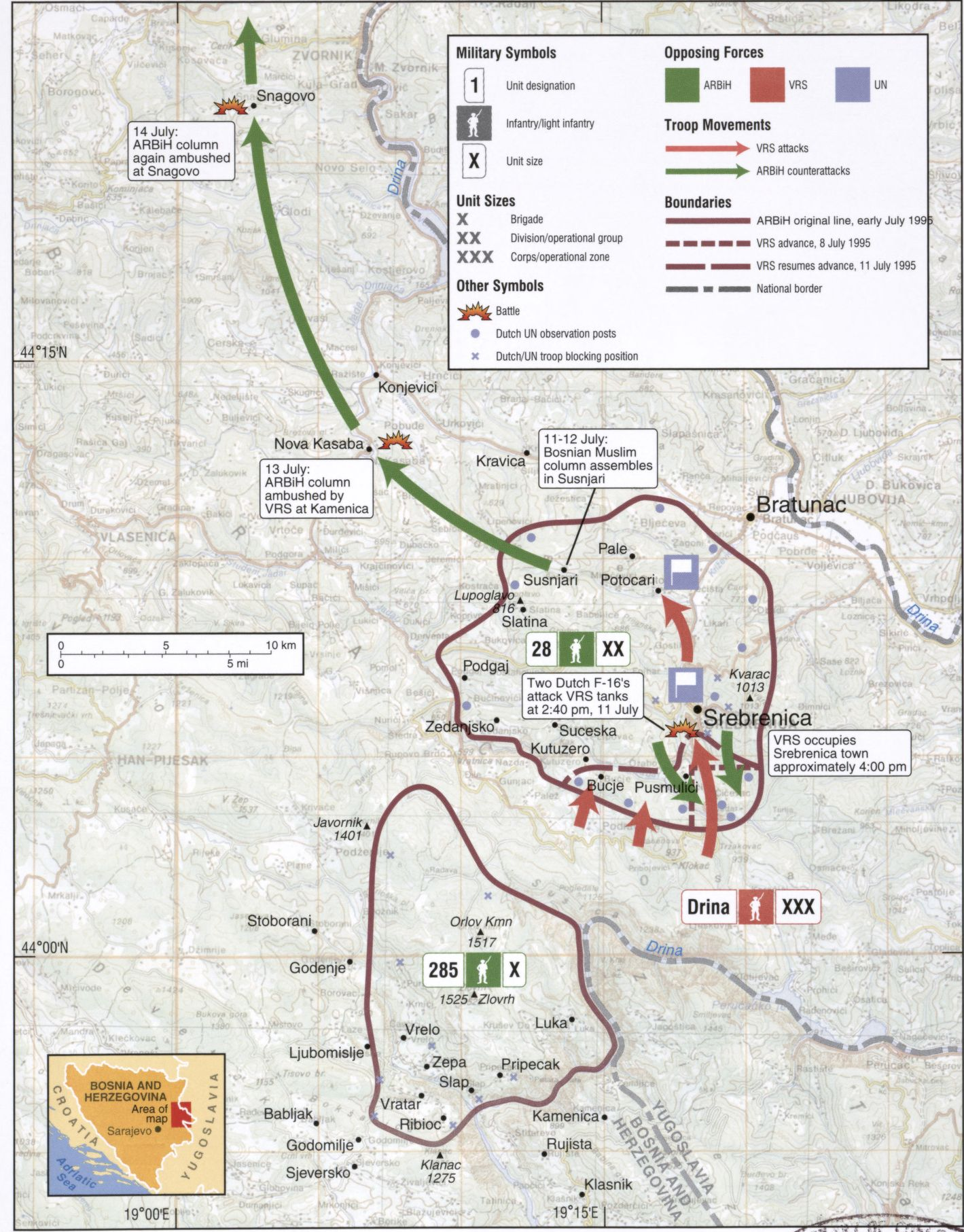
Map of military operations during the Srebrenica massacre. The green arrow marks the route of the Bosniak column.

On the evening of 11 July, word spread that able-bodied men should take to the woods, form a column with the ARBiH's 28th Division and attempt a breakthrough towards Bosnian government-held territory in the north. They believed they stood a better chance of surviving by trying to escape, than if they fell into Serb hands. Around 10 pm on 11 July the Division command, with the municipal authorities, took the decision to form a column and attempt to reach government territory around Tuzla. Dehydration, along with lack of sleep and exhaustion were further problems; there was little cohesion or common purpose. Along the way, the column was shelled and ambushed. In severe mental distress, some refugees killed themselves. Others were induced to surrender. Survivors claimed they were attacked with a chemical agent that caused hallucinations, disorientation and strange behaviour. Infiltrators in civilian clothing confused, attacked and killed refugees. Many taken prisoner were killed on the spot. Others were collected and taken to remote locations, for execution.

The attacks broke the column into smaller segments. Only about one third succeeded in crossing the asphalt road between Konjević Polje and Nova Kasaba. This group reached Bosnian government territory on and after 16 July. A second, smaller group (700–800) attempted to escape into Serbia. It is not known how many were intercepted and killed. A third group headed for Žepa; estimates of how many vary between 300 and 850. Pockets of resistance apparently remained behind and engaged Serb forces.

==== Tuzla column departs ====
Almost all the 28th Division, 5,500 to 6,000 soldiers, not all armed, gathered in Šušnjari, in the hills north of Srebrenica, along with about 7,000 civilians. They included a few women. Others assembled in the nearby village of Jaglići.

Around midnight, the column started moving along the axis between Konjević Polje and Bratunac. It was preceded by four scouts, 5 km ahead. Members walked one behind the other, following a trail a demining unit had marked with paper to guide them.

The column was led by 50–100 of the best soldiers from each brigade, carrying the best equipment. Elements of the 284th Brigade were followed by the 280th Brigade. Civilians accompanied by other soldiers followed, and at the back was the independent battalion. The command and armed men were at the front, following the deminer unit. Others included political leaders of the enclave, medical staff and families of prominent Srebrenicans. A few women, children and elderly travelled with the column in the woods. The column was 12–15 km long, two and a half hours separating head from tail.

The attempt to reach Tuzla surprised the VRS and caused confusion, as the VRS had expected the men to go to Potočari. Serb general Milan Gvero, in a briefing, referred to the column as "hardened and violent criminals who will stop at nothing to prevent being taken prisoner". The VRS Main Staff ordered all available manpower to find any Muslim groups observed, prevent them crossing into Muslim territory, take them prisoner and hold them in buildings that could be secured by small forces.

==== Ambush at Kamenica Hill ====
During the night, poor visibility, fear of mines and panic induced by artillery fire split the column in two. On the afternoon of 12 July, the front section emerged from the woods and crossed the asphalt road from Konjević Polje and Nova Kasaba. Around 6pm, the VRS Army located the main part of the column around Kamenica. Around 8pm this part, led by the municipal authorities and wounded, started descending Kamenica Hill towards the road. After about 40 men had crossed, soldiers of the VRS arrived from the direction of Kravica in trucks and armoured vehicles, including a white vehicle with UNPROFOR symbols, calling over the loudspeaker, to surrender.

Yellow smoke was observed, followed by strange behaviour, including suicides, hallucinations and column members attacking one another. Survivors claimed they were attacked with a chemical agent that caused hallucinations and disorientation. General Tolimir was an advocate of the use of chemical weapons against the ARBiH. Shooting and shelling began, which continued into the night. Armed members of the column returned fire and all scattered. Survivors at least 1,000 engaged at close range by small arms. Hundreds appear to have been killed as they fled the open area and some were said to have killed themselves to escape capture.

VRS and Ministry of Interior personnel persuaded column members to surrender, by promising them safe transportation towards Tuzla, under UNPROFOR and Red Cross supervision. Appropriated UN and Red Cross equipment was used to deceive them. Belongings were confiscated and some executed on the spot.

The rear of the column lost contact and panic broke out. Many remained in the Kamenica Hill area for days, with the escape route blocked by Serb forces. Thousands of Bosniaks surrendered or were captured. Some were ordered to summon friends and family from the woods. There were reports of Serb forces using megaphones to call on the marchers to surrender, telling them they would be exchanged for Serb soldiers. It was at Kamenica that VRS personnel in civilian dress were reported to have infiltrated the column. Men who survived described it as a manhunt.

==== Sandići massacre ====
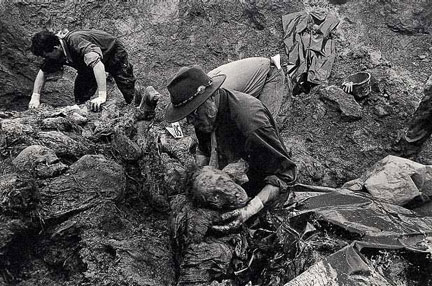
Exhumations in Srebrenica, 1996

Close to Sandići, on the main road from Bratunac to Konjević Polje, a witness described the Serbs forcing a Bosniak man to call other Bosniaks down from the mountains. 200–300 men, including the witness' brother, descended to meet the VRS, presumably expecting an exchange of prisoners. The witness hid behind a tree and watched as the men were lined up in seven ranks, each 40 m long, with hands behind their heads; they were then mowed down by machine guns.

Some women, children and elderly people who had been part of the column, were allowed to join buses evacuating women and children from Potočari.

==== Trek to Mount Udrč ====
The central section of the column managed to escape the shooting, reached Kamenica around 11am and waited for the wounded. Captain Golić and the Independent Battalion turned back towards Hajdučko Groblje, to help the casualties. Survivors from the rear, crossed the asphalt roads to the north or the west, and joined the central section. The front third of the column, which had left Kamenica Hill by the time the ambush occurred, headed for Mount Udrč (44°16′59″N 19°3′6″E); crossing the main asphalt road. They reached the base of the mountain on Thursday 13 July and regrouped. At first, it was decided to send 300 ARBiH soldiers back to break through the blockades. When reports came that the central section had crossed the road at Konjević Polje, this plan was abandoned. Approximately 1,000 additional men managed to reach Udrč that night.

==== Snagovo ambush ====
From Udrč, the marchers moved toward the Drinjača River and Mount Velja Glava. Finding Serbs at Mount Velja Glava, on Friday, 14 July, the column skirted the mountain and waited on its slopes, before moving toward Liplje and Marčići. Arriving at Marčići in the evening of 14 July, they were ambushed again near Snagovo by forces equipped with anti-aircraft guns, artillery, and tanks. The column broke through and captured a VRS officer, providing them with a bargaining counter. This prompted an attempt at negotiating a ceasefire, but this failed.

==== Approaching the frontline ====
The evening of 15 July saw the first radio contact between the 2nd Corps and the 28th Division. The Šabić brothers were able to identify each other as they stood on either side of the VRS lines. Early in the morning, the column crossed the road linking Zvornik with Caparde and headed towards Planinci, leaving 100–200 armed marchers behind to wait for stragglers. The column reached Križevići later that day, and remained while an attempt was made to negotiate with Serb forces, for safe passage. They were advised to stay where they were, and allow Serb forces to arrange safe passage. It became apparent, that the small Serb force was only trying to gain time to organise another attack. In the area of Marčići–Crni Vrh, VRS armed forces deployed 500 soldiers and policemen to stop the split part of the column, about 2,500 people, which was moving from Glodi towards Marčići. The column's leaders decided to form small groups of 100–200 and send these to reconnoitre ahead. The 2nd Corps and 28th Division of the ARBiH met each other in Potočani.

==== Breakthrough at Baljkovica ====
The hillside at Baljkovica (44°27′N 18°58′E) formed the last VRS line separating the column from Bosnian-held territory. The VRS cordon consisted of two lines, the first of which presented a front on the Tuzla side, against the 2nd Corps and the other a front against the approaching 28th Division.

On the evening of 15 July a hailstorm caused Serb forces to take cover. The column's advance group took advantage to attack the Serb rear lines at Baljkovica. The main body of what remained of the column began to move from Križevići. It reached the area of fighting around 3 am on Sunday, 16 July. At approximately 5am, the 2nd Corps made its first attempt to break through the VRS cordon. The objective was to breakthrough close to the hamlets of Parlog and Resnik. They were joined by Orić and some of his men. Around 8 am, parts of the 28th Division, with the 2nd Corps of the ARBiH from Tuzla providing artillery support, attacked and breached VRS lines. There was fierce fighting across Baljkovica. The column finally succeeded in breaking through to Bosnian government-controlled territory, between 1 and 2 pm.

==== Baljkovica corridor ====
Following radio negotiations between the 2nd Corps and Zvornik Brigade, Brigade Command agreed to open a corridor to allow "evacuation" of the column in return for the release of captured policemen and soldiers. The corridor was open 2–5pm. After the corridor was closed between 5 and 6 pm, the Zvornik Brigade Command reported that around 5000 civilians, with probably "a certain number of soldiers" with them had been let through, but "all those who passed were unarmed".

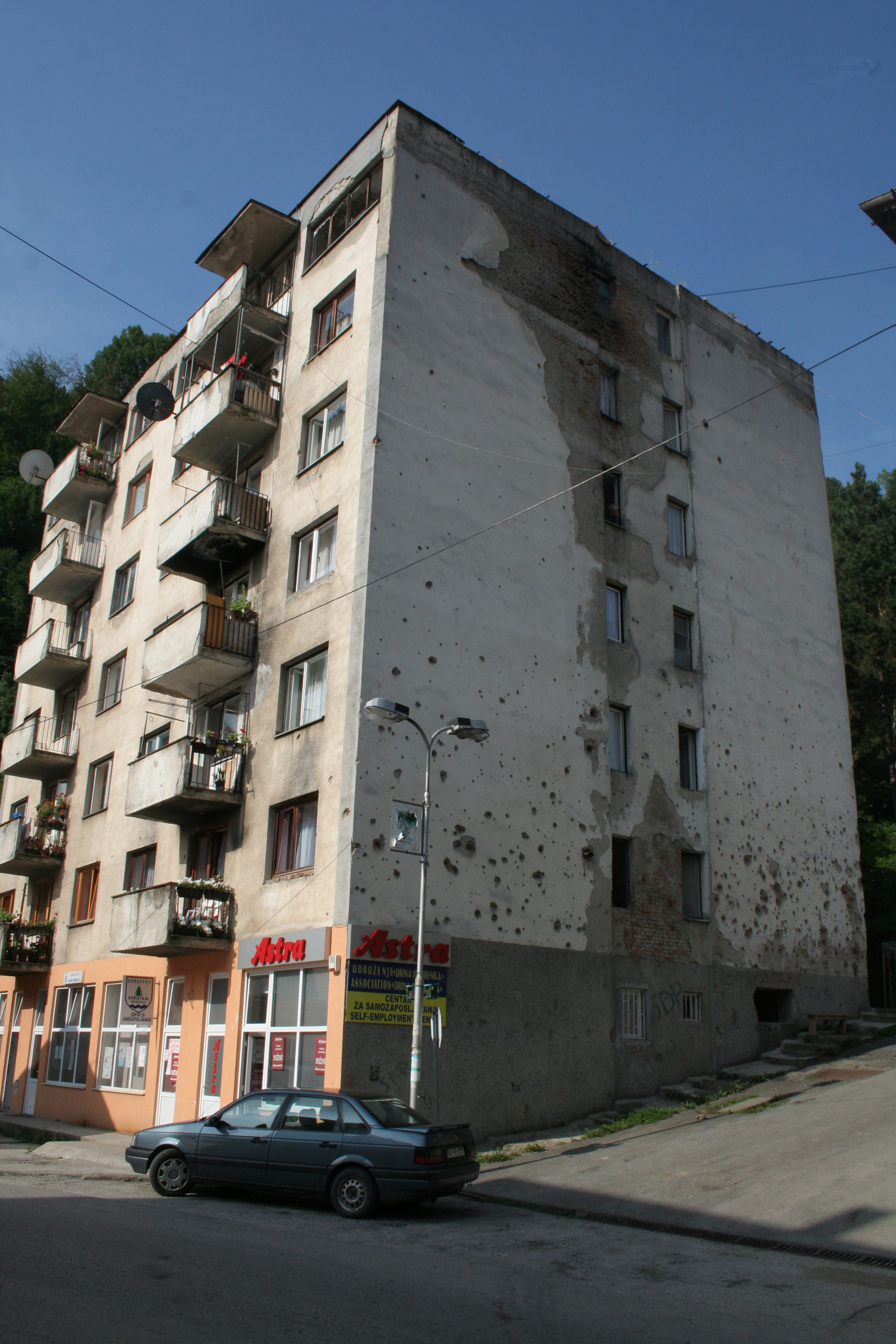
Damaged building in Srebrenica after the war

By about 4 August, the ARBiH determined that 3,175 members of the 28th Division had managed to get through to Tuzla. 2,628 members of the Division, soldiers and officers, were considered certain to have been killed. Column members killed was between 8,300 and 9,722.

==== After closure of the corridor ====
Once the corridor had closed, Serb forces recommenced hunting down parts of the column. Around 2,000 refugees were reported to be hiding in the woods in the area of Pobuđe. On 17 July, four children aged between 8 and 14 captured by the Bratunac Brigade were taken to the military barracks in Bratunac. Brigade Commander Blagojević suggested the Drina Corps' press unit record this testimony on video.

On 18 July, after a soldier was killed "trying to capture some persons during the search operation", the Zvornik Brigade Command issued an order to execute prisoners, to avoid any risks associated with their capture. The order was presumed to have remained effective until countermanded on 21 July.

==== Impact on survivors ====
According to a 1998 qualitative study involving survivors, many column members exhibited symptoms of hallucinations to varying degrees. Several times, Bosniak men attacked one another, in fear the other was a Serb soldier. Survivors reported seeing people speaking incoherently, running towards VRS lines in a rage and committing suicide using firearms and hand grenades. Although there was no evidence to suggest what exactly caused the behaviour, the study suggested fatigue and stress may have induced this.

=== A plan to execute the men ===
Although Serb forces had long been blamed for the massacre, it was not until 2004—following the Srebrenica Commission's report—that Serb officials acknowledged their forces carried out the mass killing. Their report acknowledged the mass murder of the men and boys was planned, and more than 7,800 were killed.

A concerted effort was made to capture all Bosniak men of military age. In fact, those captured included many boys well below that age, and men years above that age, who remained in the enclave following the take-over of Srebrenica. These men and boys were targeted, regardless of whether they chose to flee to Potočari or join the column. The operation to capture and detain the men was well-organised and comprehensive. The buses which transported women and children, were systematically searched for men.

=== Mass executions ===
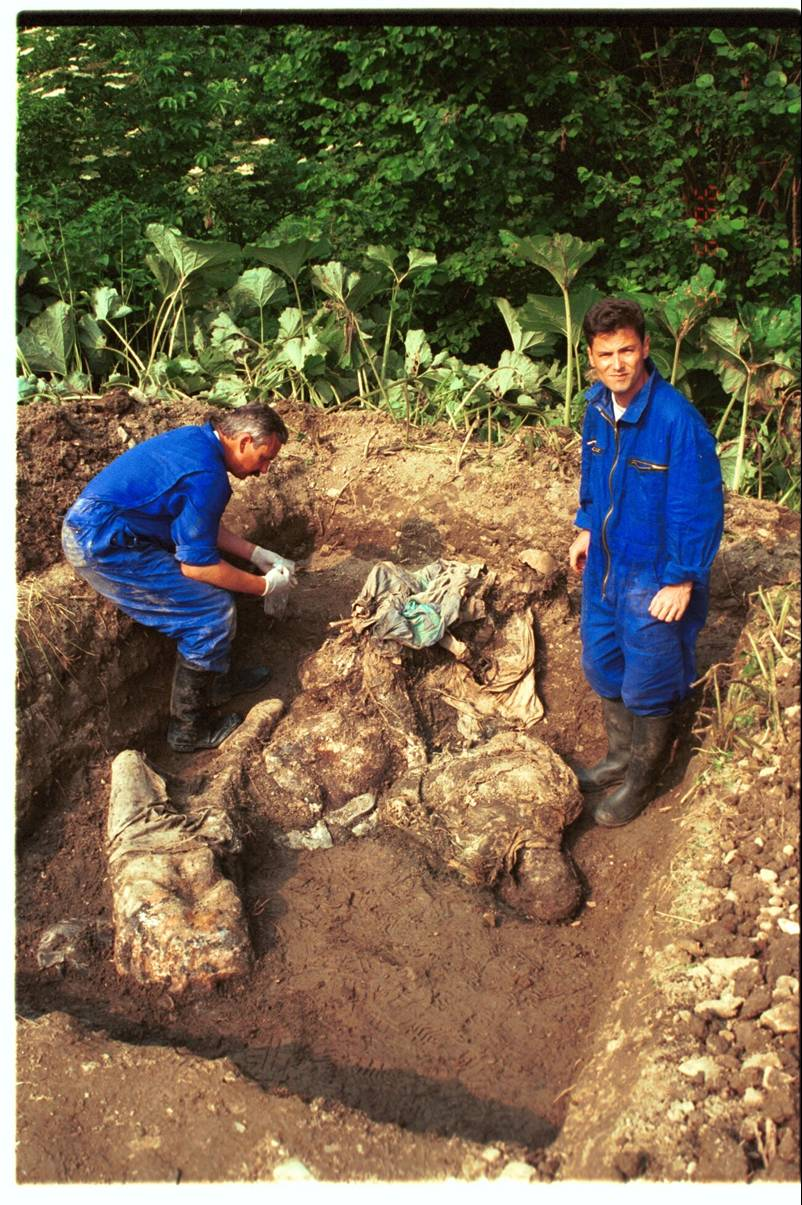
Exhumed remains of murdered victims at Nova Kasaba during an initial probe of mass graves

The amount of planning and high-level coordination invested in killing thousands in a few days, is apparent from the scale and methodical nature in which the executions were carried out.

The VRS took the largest number of prisoners on 13 July, along the Bratunac–Konjević Polje road. Witnesses describe the assembly points, such as the field at Sandići, agricultural warehouses in Kravica, the school in Konjević Polje, the football pitch in Nova Kasaba, Lolići and Luke school. Several thousand people were herded in the field near Sandići and on the Nova Kasaba pitch, where they were searched and put into smaller groups. In a video by journalist Zoran Petrović, a Serb soldier states that at least 3,000–4,000 men gave themselves up on the road. By the late afternoon of 13 July, the total had risen to 6,000 according to intercepted radio communication; the following day, Major Franken of Dutchbat was given the same figure by Colonel Radislav Janković of the Serb army. Many prisoners had been seen in the locations described, by passing convoys taking women and children to Kladanj by bus, while aerial photos provided evidence to confirm this.

One hour after the evacuation of women from Potočari was complete, the Drina Corps staff diverted the buses to the areas in which the men were being held. Colonel Krsmanović, who on 12 July had arranged the buses for the evacuation, ordered the 700 men in Sandići to be collected, and the soldiers guarding them, made them throw their possessions on a heap and hand over valuables. During the afternoon, the group in Sandići was visited by Mladić, who told them they would come to no harm, be treated as prisoners of war, exchanged for other prisoners, and that their families had been escorted to Tuzla in safety. Some men were placed on transports to Bratunac and other locations, while some were marched to warehouses in Kravica. The men gathered on the pitch at Nova Kasaba were forced to hand over belongings. They too received a visit from Mladić during the afternoon of 13 July; on this occasion, he announced that the Bosnian authorities in Tuzla did not want them and so they were to be taken elsewhere. The men in Nova Kasaba were loaded onto buses and trucks and taken to Bratunac, or other locations.

The Bosniak men who had been separated from the women, children and elderly in Potočari, numbering approximately 1,000, were transported to Bratunac and joined by Bosniak men captured from the column. Almost without exception, the thousands of prisoners captured after the take-over were executed. Some were killed individually, or in small groups, by the soldiers who captured them. Most were killed in carefully orchestrated mass executions, commencing on 13 July, just north of Srebrenica.

The mass executions followed a well-established pattern. The men were taken to empty schools or warehouses. After being detained for hours, they were loaded onto buses or trucks and taken to another site, usually in an isolated location. They were unarmed and often steps were taken to minimise resistance, such as blindfolding, binding their wrists behind their backs with ligatures, or removing their shoes. Once at the killing fields, the men were taken off the trucks in small groups, lined up and shot. Those who survived the initial shooting were shot with an extra round, though sometimes only after they had been left to suffer.

==== Morning of 13 July: Jadar River ====
Prior to midday on 13 July, seventeen men were transported by bus a short distance to a spot on the banks of the Jadar River where they were lined up and shot. One man, after being hit in the hip by a bullet, jumped into the river and managed to escape.

==== Early afternoon of 13 July: Cerska Valley ====
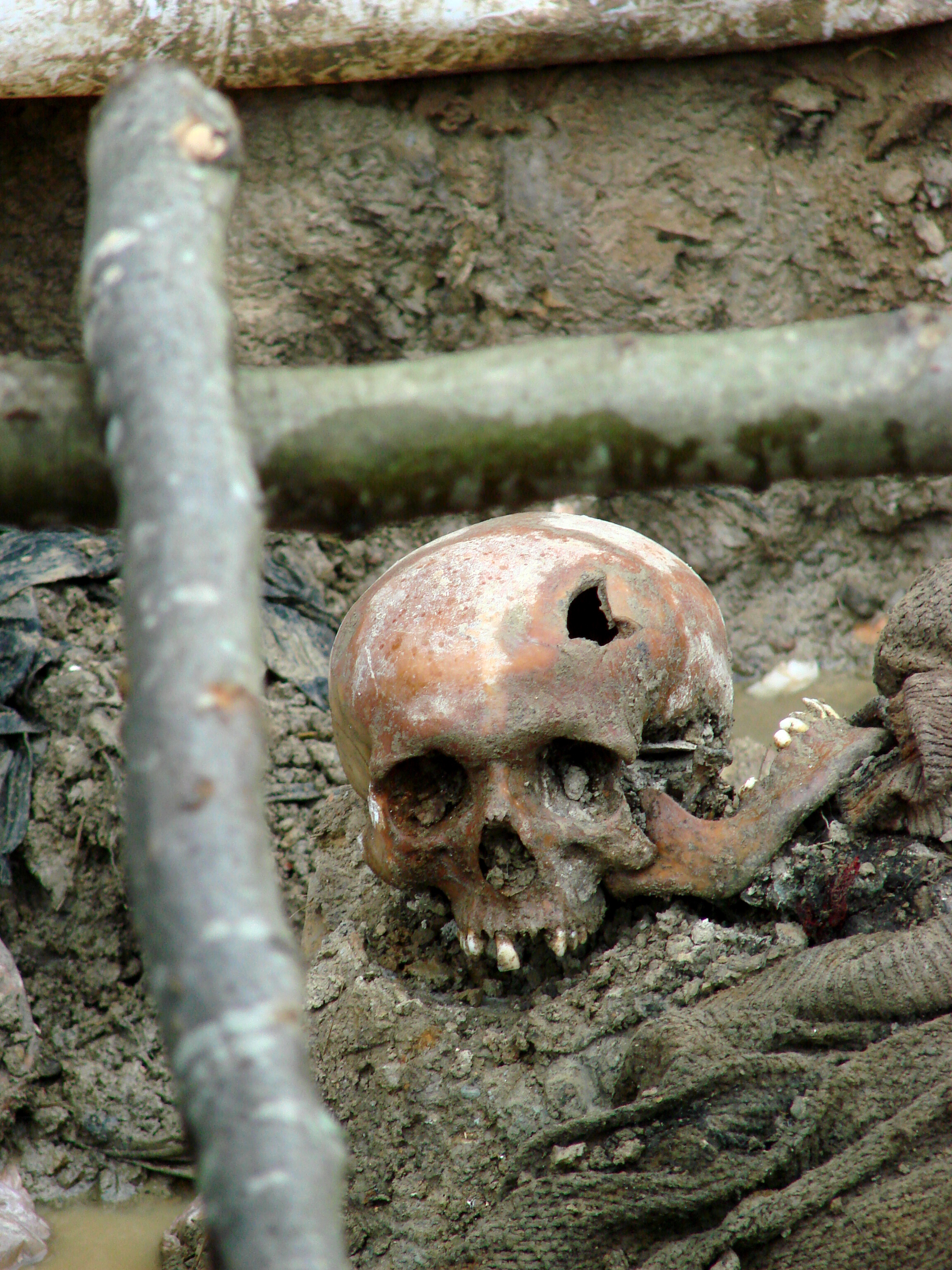
Skull of a victim, at an exhumed mass grave outside the village of Potočari, July 2007.

The first mass executions began on 13 July in the valley of the River Cerska, to the west of Konjević Polje. One witness, hidden among trees, saw two or three trucks, followed by an armoured vehicle and earthmoving machine proceeding towards Cerska. He heard gunshots for half an hour and then saw the armoured vehicle going in the opposite direction, but not the earthmoving machine. Other witnesses report seeing a pool of blood alongside the road to Cerska. Muhamed Duraković, a UN translator, probably passed this execution site later that day. He reports seeing bodies tossed into a ditch alongside the road, with some men still alive.

Aerial photos, and excavations, confirmed the presence of a mass grave near this location. Bullet cartridges, found at the scene, showed that the victims were first lined up on one side of the road, whereupon their executioners shot from the other. The 150 bodies were covered with earth where they lay. It was later established they had been killed by gunfire. All were male, aged 14–50, and all but three were wearing civilian clothes. Many had their hands tied behind their backs. Nine were later identified on the Srebrenica missing persons list.

==== Late afternoon of 13 July: Kravica ====
Later on 13 July, executions were conducted in the largest of four farm sheds, owned by the Agricultural Cooperative in Kravica. Between 1,000 and 1,500 men had been captured in fields near Sandići and detained in Sandići Meadow. They were brought to Kravica, either by bus or on foot, the distance being approximately 1 km. A witness recalls seeing around 200 men, stripped to the waist and with their hands in the air, being forced to run in the direction of Kravica. An aerial photo taken at 2pm shows two buses standing in front of the sheds.

At around 6pm, when the men were all held in the warehouse, VRS soldiers threw in hand grenades and fired weapons, including rocket propelled grenades. This mass murder seemed "well organised and involved a substantial amount of planning, requiring the participation of the Drina Corps Command".

Supposedly, there was more killing in and around Kravica and Sandići. Even before the murders in the warehouse, some 200 or 300 men were formed up in ranks near Sandići, then executed en masse with concentrated machine gun fire. At Kravica, it was claimed some local men assisted the killings. Some victims were mutilated and killed with knives. The bodies were taken to Bratunac, or simply dumped in the river that runs alongside the road. One witness stated this all took place on 14 July. There were three survivors of the mass murder in the farm sheds at Kravica.

Armed guards shot at the men who tried to climb out the windows to escape the massacre. When the shooting stopped, the shed was full of bodies. Another survivor, who was only slightly wounded, reports:

I was not even able to touch the floor, the concrete floor of the warehouse ... After the shooting, I felt a strange kind of heat, warmth, which was coming from the blood that covered the concrete floor and I was stepping on the dead people who were lying around. But there were even men (just men) who were still alive, who were only wounded and as soon as I would step on him, I would hear him cry, moan, because I was trying to move as fast as I could. I could tell that people had been completely disembodied and I could feel bones of the people that had been hit by those bursts of bullets or shells, I could feel their ribs crushing. Then I would get up again and continue.

When this witness climbed out of a window, he was seen by a guard who shot at him. He pretended to be dead and managed to escape the following morning. The other witness quoted above spent the night under a heap of bodies; the next morning, he watched as the soldiers examined the corpses for signs of life. The few survivors were forced to sing Serbian songs and were then shot. Once the final victim had been killed, an excavator was driven in to shunt the bodies out of the shed; the asphalt outside was then hosed down with water. In September 1996, however, it was still possible to find the evidence.

Analyses of hair, blood and explosives residue collected at the Kravica Warehouse provide strong evidence of the killings. Experts determined the presence of bullet strikes, explosives residue, bullets and shell cases, as well as human blood, bones and tissue adhering to the walls and floors of the building. Forensic evidence presented by the ICTY Prosecutor established a link between the executions in Kravica and the 'primary' mass grave known as Glogova 2, in which the remains of 139 people were found. In the 'secondary' grave known as Zeleni Jadar 5, there were 145 bodies, several were charred. Pieces of brick and window frame found in the Glogova 1 grave that was opened later, also established a link with Kravica. Here, the remains of 191 victims were found.

==== 13–14 July: Tišća ====
As the buses crowded with Bosniak women, children and elderly made their way from Potočari to Kladanj, they were stopped at Tišća village, searched, and the Bosniak men and boys found on board were removed. The evidence reveals a well-organised operation in Tišća.

From the checkpoint, an officer directed the soldier escorting the witness towards a nearby school where many other prisoners were being held. At the school, a soldier on a field telephone appeared to be transmitting and receiving orders. Around midnight, the witness was loaded onto a truck with 22 other men with their hands tied behind their backs. At one point the truck stopped and a soldier said: "Not here. Take them up there, where they took people before." The truck reached another stopping point and the soldiers came to the back of the truck and started shooting the prisoners. The survivor escaped by running away from the truck and hiding in a forest.

==== 14 July: Grbavci and Orahovac ====
A large group of prisoners held overnight in Bratunac were bussed in a convoy of 30 vehicles to the Grbavci school in Orahovica, early on 14 July. When they arrived, the gym was already half-full with prisoners and within a few hours, the building was full. Survivors estimated there were about 2,000 men, some very young, others elderly, although the ICTY Prosecution suggested this may be an overestimation, with the number closer to 1,000. Some prisoners were taken outside and killed. At some point, a witness recalled, General Mladić arrived and told the men: "Well, your government does not want you and I have to take care of you."

After being held in the gym for hours, the men were led out in small groups to the execution fields that afternoon. Each prisoner was blindfolded and given water as he left. The prisoners were taken in trucks to the fields less than 1 km away. The men were lined up and shot in the back; those who survived were killed with an extra shot. Two adjacent meadows were used; once one was full of bodies, the executioners moved to the other. While the executions were in progress, the survivors said earth-moving equipment dug the graves. A witness reported that Mladić watched some of the executions.

The forensic evidence supports crucial aspects of the testimony. Aerial photos show the ground in Orahovac was disturbed between 5 and 27 July and between 7 and 27 September. Two primary mass graves were uncovered in the area and named Lazete 1 and Lazete 2 by investigators. Lazete 1 was exhumed by the ICTY in 2000. All of the 130 individuals uncovered, for whom sex could be determined, were male; 138 blindfolds were found. Identification material for 23 persons, listed as missing following the fall of Srebrenica, was located during the exhumations. Lazete 2 was partly exhumed by a joint team, from the Office of the Prosecutor and Physicians for Human Rights, in 1996 and completed in 2000. All of the 243 victims associated with Lazete 2 were male, and experts determined most died of gunshot injuries. 147 blindfolds were located. Forensic analysis of soil/pollen samples, blindfolds, ligatures, shell cases and aerial images of creation/disturbance dates, further revealed that bodies, from Lazete 1 and 2, were reburied at secondary graves named Hodžići Road 3, 4 and 5. Aerial images show these secondary gravesites were begun in early September 1995 and all were exhumed in 1998.

==== 14–15 July: Petkovci ====
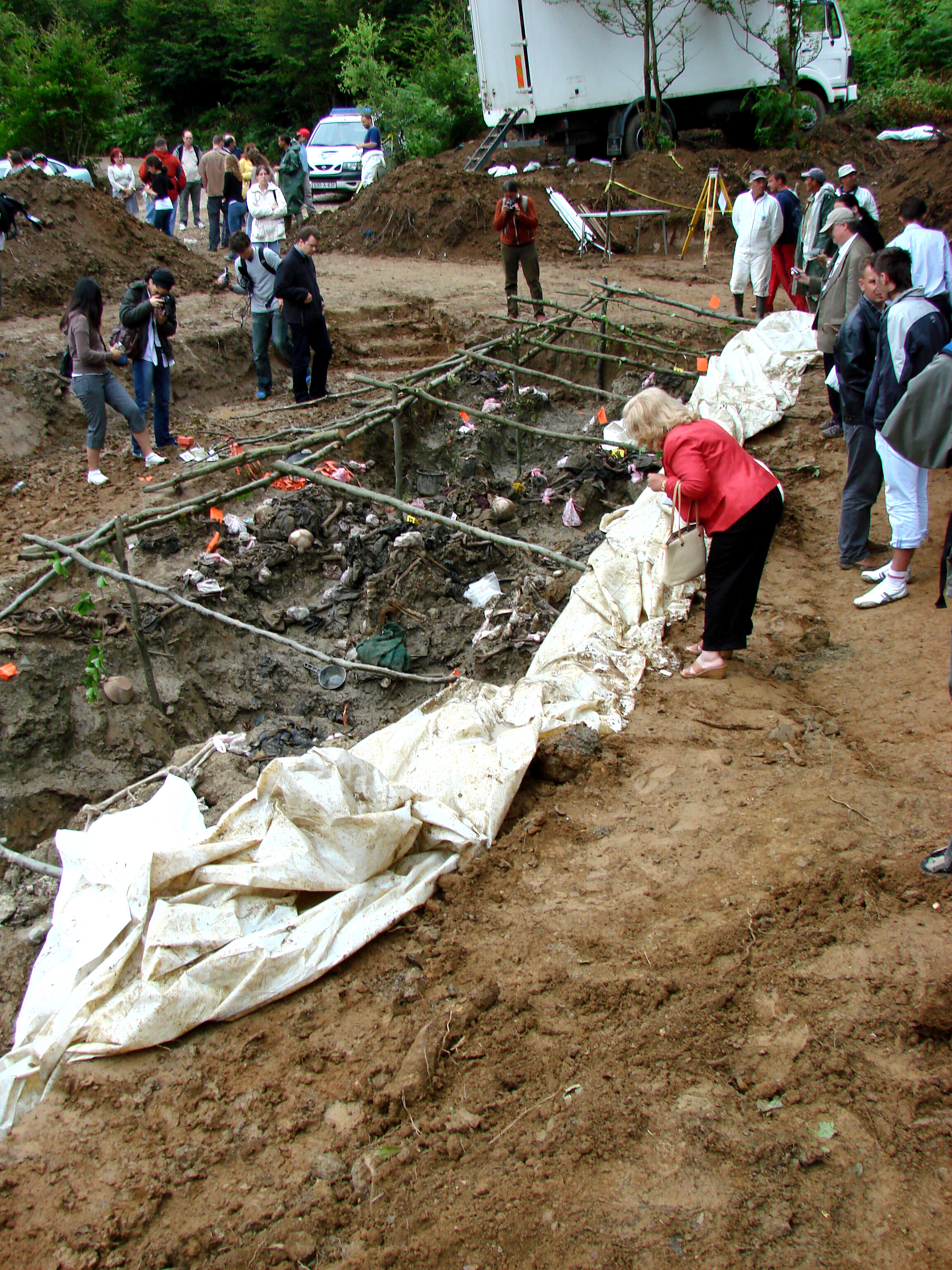
Delegates of the International Association of Genocide Scholars (IAGS) examine an exhumed mass grave, outside the village of Potočari, July 2007.

On 14 and 15 July 1995, another group of prisoners numbering 1,500 to 2,000 were taken from Bratunac to the school in Petkovci. The conditions at the Petkovci school were even worse than Grbavci. It was hot, and overcrowded and there was no food or water. In the absence of anything else, some prisoners chose to drink their urine. Now and then, soldiers would enter the room and physically abuse prisoners or call them outside. A few contemplated an escape attempt, but others said it would be better to stay since the International Red Cross would be sure to monitor the situation and they could not all be killed.

The men were called outside in small groups. They were ordered to strip to the waist and remove their shoes, whereupon their hands were tied behind their backs. During the night of 14 July, the men were taken by truck to the dam at Petkovci. Those who arrived later could see immediately what was happening. Bodies were strewn on the ground, hands tied behind their backs. Small groups of five to ten men were taken out of the trucks, lined up and shot. Some begged for water but their pleas were ignored. A survivor described his feelings of fear combined with thirst:

I was really sorry that I would die thirsty, and I was trying to hide amongst the people as long as I could, like everybody else. I just wanted to live for another second or two. And when it was my turn, I jumped out with what I believe were four other people. I could feel the gravel beneath my feet. It hurt ... I was walking with my head bent down and I wasn't feeling anything. ... And then I thought that I would die very fast, that I would not suffer. And I just thought that my mother would never know where I had ended up. This is what I was thinking as I was getting out of the truck. [As the soldiers walked around to kill the survivors of the first round of shooting] I was still very thirsty. But I was sort of between life and death. I didn't know whether I wanted to live or die anymore. I decided not to call out for them to shoot and kill me, but I was sort of praying to God that they'd come and kill me.

After the soldiers had left, two survivors helped each other to untie their hands and crawled over the bodies towards the woods, where they intended to hide. As dawn arrived, they could see the execution site where bulldozers were collecting the bodies. On the way to the execution site, one survivor peeked out from under his blindfold and saw Mladić on his way to the scene.

Aerial photos confirmed the earth near the Petkovci dam had been disturbed and it was disturbed again in late September 1995. When the grave was opened in April 1998, there seemed to be many bodies missing. Their removal had been accomplished with mechanical apparatus, causing considerable disturbance. The grave contained the remains of no more than 43 persons. Other bodies had been removed to a secondary grave, Liplje 2, before 2 October. Here, the remains of at least 191 individuals were discovered.

==== 14–16 July: Branjevo ====
On 14 July, more prisoners from Bratunac were bussed northward to a school in Pilica. As at other detention facilities, there was no food or water and several died from heat and dehydration. The men were held at the school for two nights. On 16 July, following a now familiar pattern, the men were called out and loaded onto buses with their hands tied behind their backs, driven to the Branjevo Military Farm, where groups of 10 were lined up and shot.

Dražen Erdemović—who confessed to killing at least 70 Bosniaks—was a member of the VRS 10th Sabotage Detachment. Erdemović appeared as a prosecution witness and testified: "The men in front of us were ordered to turn their backs ... we shot at them. We were given orders to shoot." On this point, a survivor recalls:

When they shot, I threw myself on the ground ... one man fell on my head. I think that he was killed on the spot. I could feel the hot blood pouring over me ... I could hear one man crying for help. He was begging them to kill him. And they simply said "Let him suffer. We'll kill him later."

— Witness Q

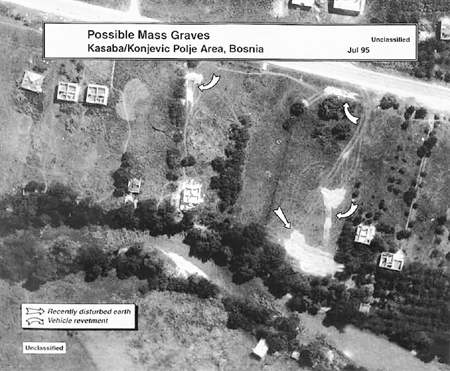
Satellite photo of Nova Kasaba mass graves

Erdemović said nearly all the victims wore civilian clothes and, except for one person who tried to escape, offered no resistance. Sometimes the executioners were particularly cruel. When some soldiers recognised acquaintances, they beat and humiliated them, before killing them. Erdemović had to persuade fellow soldiers to stop using machine guns; while it mortally wounded the prisoners, it did not cause death immediately and prolonged their suffering. Between 1,000 and 1,200 men were killed in that day at this execution site.

Aerial photos, taken on 17 July of an area around the Branjevo Military Farm, show many bodies lying in a field, as well as traces of the excavator that collected the bodies. Erdemović testified that, at around 3pm on 16 July, after he and fellow soldiers from the 10th Sabotage Detachment had finished executing prisoners at the Farm, they were told there was a group of 500 Bosniak prisoners from Srebrenica, trying to break out of a Dom Kulture club. Erdemović and other members of his unit refused to carry out more killings. They were told to meet with a Lieutenant Colonel at a café in Pilica. Erdemović and his fellow soldiers travelled to the café and, as they waited, could hear shots and grenades being detonated. The sounds lasted 15–20 minutes after which a soldier entered the café to inform them "everything was over".

There were no survivors to explain exactly what happened in the Dom Kulture. The executions there were remarkable as this was not remote, but a town centre on the main road from Zvornik to Bijeljina. Over a year later, it was still possible to find physical evidence of this crime. As in Kravica, many traces of blood, hair and body tissue were found in the building, with cartridges and shells littered throughout the two storeys. It could be established that explosives and machine guns had been used. Human remains and personal possessions were found under the stage, where blood had dripped down through the floorboards.

Two of the three survivors of the executions at the Branjevo Military Farm, were arrested by Bosnian Serb police on 25 July and sent to the prisoner of war compound at Batković. One had been a member of the group separated from the women in Potočari on 13 July. The prisoners who were taken to Batković survived and testified before the Tribunal.

Čančari Road 12 was the site of the reinterment of at least 174 bodies, moved from the mass grave at the Branjevo Military Farm. Only 43 were complete sets of remains, most of which established that death was due to rifle fire. Of the 313 body parts found, 145 displayed gunshot wounds of a severity likely to prove fatal.

==== 14–17 July: Kozluk ====
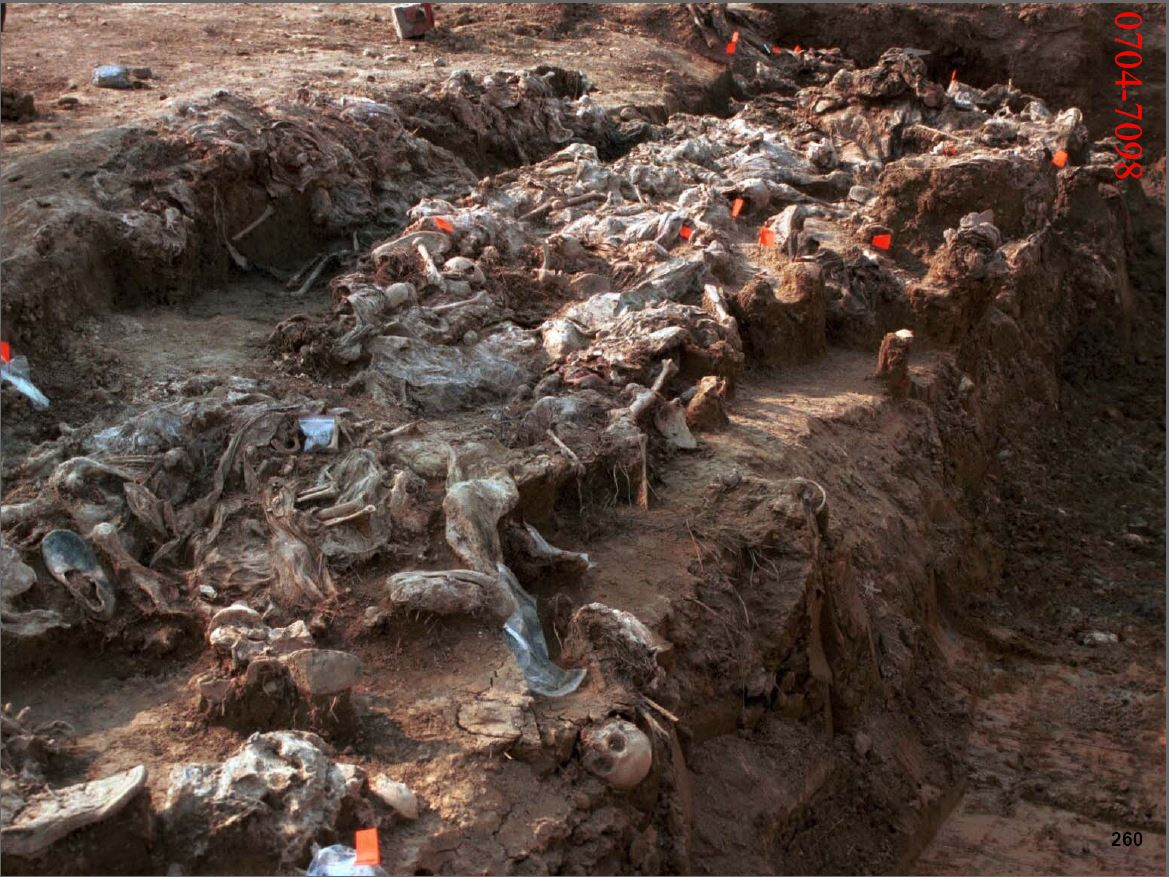
Exhumation of the Srebrenica massacre victims

The exact date of the executions at Kozluk is unknown, though most probably 15–16 July, partly due to its location, between Petkovci Dam and the Branjevo Military Farm. It falls within the pattern of ever more northerly execution sites: Orahovac on 14 July, Petkovci Dam on 15 July, the Branjevo Military Farm and Pilica Dom Kulture on 16 July. Another indication is that a Zvornik Brigade excavator spent eight hours in Kozluk on 16 July and a truck belonging to the same brigade made two journeys between Orahovac and Kozluk that day. A bulldozer is known to have been active in Kozluk on 18 and 19 July.

Among Bosnian refugees in Germany, there were rumours of executions in Kozluk, during which 500 or so prisoners were forced to sing Serbian songs as they were being transported to the execution site. Though no survivors have come forward, investigations in 1999 led to the discovery of a mass grave near Kozluk. This proved to be the location of execution as well, and lay alongside the Drina accessible only by driving through the barracks occupied by the Drina Wolves, a police unit of Republika Srpska. The grave was not dug specifically for the purpose: it had previously been a quarry and landfill site. Investigators found many shards of glass which the nearby Vitinka bottling plant had dumped there. This facilitated the process of establishing links with the secondary graves along Čančari Road. The grave at Kozluk had been partly cleared before 27 September 1995, but no fewer than 340 bodies were found there. In 237 cases, it was clear they had died as the result of rifle fire: 83 by a single shot to the head, 76 by one shot through the torso region, 72 by multiple bullet wounds, five by wounds to the legs and one by bullet wounds to the arm. Their ages were between 8 and 85. Some had been physically disabled, occasionally as the result of amputation. Many had been tied and bound using strips of clothing or nylon thread.

Along the Čančari Road are twelve known mass graves, of which only two—Čančari Road 3 and 12—have been investigated in detail (as of 2000). Čančari Road 3 is known to have been a secondary grave linked to Kozluk, as shown by the glass fragments and labels from the Vitinka factory. The remains of 158 victims were found here, of which 35 bodies were more or less intact and indicated most had been killed by gunfire.

==== 13–18 July: Bratunac–Konjević Polje road ====
On 13 July, near Konjević Polje, Serb soldiers summarily executed hundreds of Bosniaks, including women and children. The men found attempting to escape by the Bratunac-Konjević Polje road were told the Geneva Convention would be observed if they gave themselves up. In Bratunac, men were told there were Serbian personnel standing by to escort them to Zagreb for a prisoner exchange. The visible presence of UN uniforms and vehicles, stolen from Dutchbat, were intended to contribute to the feeling of reassurance. On 17 to 18 July, Serb soldiers captured about 150–200 Bosniaks in the vicinity of Konjević Polje and summarily executed about one-half.

==== 18–19 July: Nezuk–Baljkovica frontline ====
After the closure of the corridor at Baljkovica, groups of stragglers nevertheless attempted to escape into Bosnian territory. Most were captured by VRS troops in the Nezuk–Baljkovica area and killed on the spot. In the vicinity of Nezuk, about 20 small groups surrendered to Bosnian Serb military forces. After the men surrendered, soldiers ordered them to line up and summarily executed them.

On 19 July, for example, a group of approximately 11 men was killed at Nezuk itself by units of the 16th Krajina Brigade, then operating under the direct command of the Zvornik Brigade. Reports reveal a further 13 men, all ARBiH soldiers, were killed at Nezuk on 19 July. The report of the march to Tuzla includes the account of an ARBiH soldier who witnessed executions carried out by police. He survived because 30 ARBiH soldiers were needed for an exchange of prisoners following the ARBiH's capture of a VRS officer at Baljkovica. The soldier was exchanged in late 1995; at that time, there were still 229 men from Srebrenica in the Batković camp, including two who had been taken prisoner in 1994.

RS Ministry of the Interior forces searching the terrain from Kamenica as far as Snagovo killed eight Bosniaks. Around 200 Muslims armed with automatic and hunting rifles were reported to be hiding near the old road near Snagovo. During the morning, about 50 Bosniaks attacked the Zvornik Brigade line in the area of Pandurica, attempting to break through to Bosnian government territory. The Zvornik Public Security Centre planned to surround and destroy these two groups the following day using all available forces.

==== 20–22 July: Maćesi area ====
According to ICTY indictments of Karadžić and Mladić, on 20 to 21 July near Maćesi, VRS personnel, using megaphones, urged Bosniak men who had fled Srebrenica to surrender and assured them they would be safe. Approximately 350 men responded to these entreaties and surrendered. The soldiers then took approximately 150, instructed them to dig their graves and executed them.

=== After the massacre ===
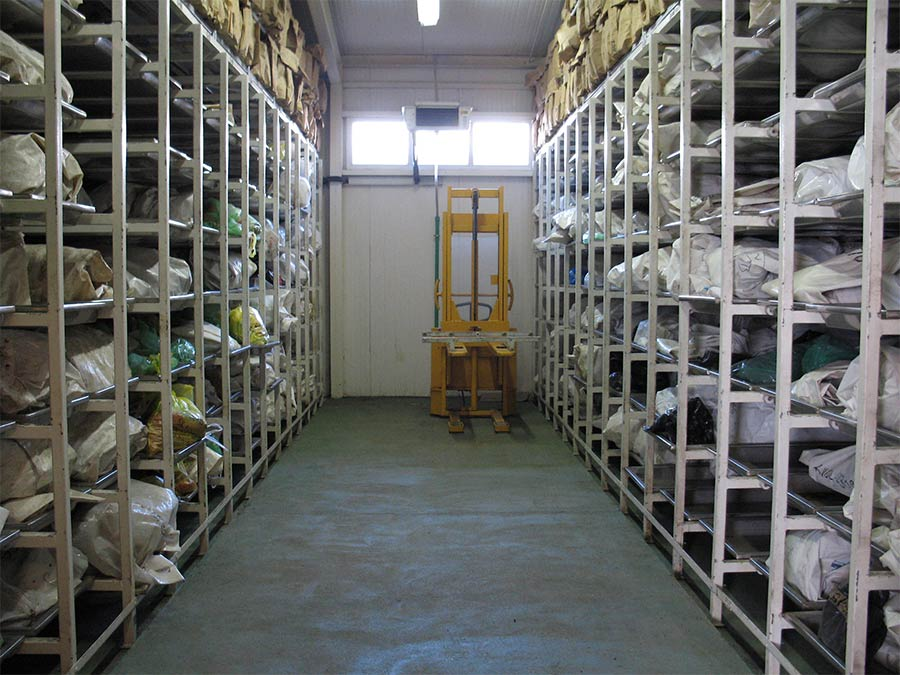
ICMP's Podrinje Identification Project (PIP) was formed to deal with the victims of the Srebrenica massacre. PIP includes a facility for storing, processing, and handling exhumed remains. Much are only fragments or commingled body fragments since they were recovered from secondary mass graves. The photo depicts one section of the refrigerated mortuary.

During the days following the massacre, US spy planes overflew Srebrenica and took photos showing the ground in vast areas around the town had been removed, a sign of mass burials.

On 22 July, the commanding officer of the Zvornik Brigade, Lieutenant Colonel Vinko Pandurević, requested the Drina Corps set up a committee to oversee the exchange of prisoners. He asked for instructions on where the prisoners of war his unit had already captured should be taken and to whom they should be handed over. Approximately 50 wounded captives were taken to the Bratunac hospital. Another group was taken to the Batković camp, and these were mostly exchanged later. On 25 July, the Zvornik Brigade captured 25 more ARBiH soldiers who were taken directly to the camp at Batković, as were 34 ARBiH men captured the following day. Zvornik Brigade reports up until 31 July continue to describe the search for refugees and the capture of small groups of Bosniaks.

Several Bosniaks managed to cross over the River Drina into Serbia at Ljubovija and Bajina Bašta. 38 were returned to RS. Some were taken to the Batković camp, where they were exchanged. The fate of the majority has not been established. Some attempting to cross the Drina drowned.

By 17 July, 201 Bosniak soldiers had arrived in Žepa, exhausted and many with light wounds. By 28 July, another 500 had arrived in Žepa from Srebrenica. After 19 July, small Bosniak groups were hiding in the woods for days and months, trying to reach Tuzla. Numerous refugees found themselves cut off in the area around Mount Udrc. They did not know what to do next or where to go; they managed to stay alive by eating vegetables and snails. The MT Udrc had become a place for ambushing marchers, and the Bosnian Serbs swept through and, according to one survivor, killed many people there.

Meanwhile, the VRS had commenced the process of clearing the bodies from around Srebrenica, Žepa, Kamenica and Snagovo. Work parties and municipal services were deployed to help. In Srebrenica, the refuse that had littered the streets since the departure of the people was collected and burnt, the town disinfected and deloused.

==== Wanderers ====
Many people in the part of the column which had not succeeded in passing Kamenica, did not wish to give themselves up and decided to turn back towards Žepa. Others remained where they were, splitting up into smaller groups of no more than ten. Some wandered around for months, either alone or groups of two, four or six men. Once Žepa had succumbed to the Serb pressure, they had to move on once more, either trying to reach Tuzla or crossing the River Drina into Serbia.

===== Zvornik 7 =====
The most famous group of seven men wandered about in occupied territory for the entire winter. On 10 May 1996, after nine months on the run and over six months after the end of the war, they were discovered in a quarry by American IFOR soldiers. They immediately turned over to the patrol; they were searched and their weapons were confiscated. The men said they had been in hiding near Srebrenica since its fall. They did not look like soldiers and the Americans decided this was a matter for the police. The operations officer of the American unit ordered that a Serb patrol should be escorted into the quarry whereupon the men would be handed over to the Serbs.

The prisoners said they were initially tortured after the transfer, but later treated relatively well. In April 1997, the local court in Republika Srpska convicted the group, known as the Zvornik 7, for illegal possession of firearms and three of them for the murder of four Serbian woodsmen. When announcing the verdict the presenter of the TV of Republika Srpska described them as "the group of Muslim terrorists from Srebrenica who last year massacred Serb civilians". The trial was condemned by the international community as "a flagrant miscarriage of justice", and the conviction quashed for 'procedural reasons' following international pressure. In 1999, the three remaining defendants in the Zvornik 7 case were swapped for three Serbs serving 15 years each in a Bosnian prison.

==== Reburials in the secondary mass graves ====
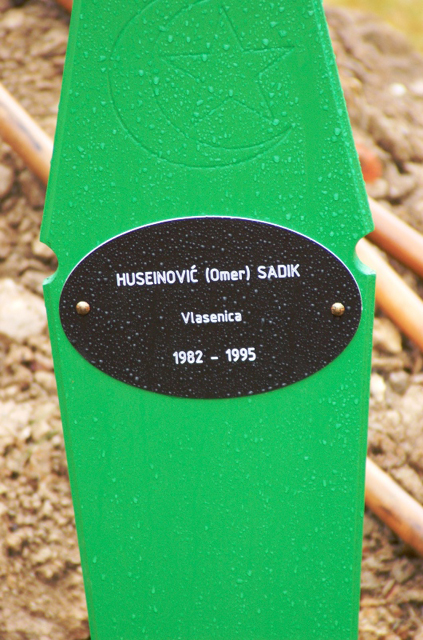
Grave of a 13-year-old

From August to October 1995, there was organised effort to remove the bodies from primary gravesites and transport them to secondary and tertiary gravesites. In the ICTY court case Prosecutor v. Blagojević and Jokić, the trial chamber found that this reburial effort was an attempt to conceal evidence of the mass murders. The trial chamber found that the cover-up operation was ordered by the VRS Main Staff and carried out by members of the Bratunac and Zvornik Brigades.

The cover-up had a direct impact on the recovery and identification of the remains. The removal and reburial of the bodies caused them to become dismembered and co-mingled, making it difficult for forensic investigators to positively identify the remains. In one case, the remains of a single person were found in two locations, 30 km apart. In addition to the ligatures and blindfolds found, the effort to hide the bodies has been seen as evidence of the organised nature of the massacres and the non-combatant status of the victims.

=== Greek volunteers controversy ===
10 Greek volunteers fought alongside the Serbs in the fall of Srebrenica. They were members of the Greek Volunteer Guard, a contingent of paramilitaries requested by Mladić, as an integral part of the Drina Corps. The volunteers were motivated to support their "Orthodox brothers" in battle. They raised the Greek flag at Srebrenica, at Mladić's request, to honour "the brave Greeks fighting on our side" and Karadžić decorated four. In 2005, Greek deputy Andrianopoulos called for an investigation, Justice Minister Anastasios Papaligouras commissioned an inquiry and in 2011, a judge said there was insufficient evidence to proceed. In 2009, Stavros Vitalis announced the volunteers were suing Takis Michas for libel over allegations in his book Unholy Alliance, which described Greece's support for the Serbs during the war. Insisting the volunteers had simply taken part in the "re-occupation" of Srebrenica, Vitalis was present with Serb officers in "all military operations".

== Post-war developments ==
=== 1995–2000: Indictments and UN Secretary-General's report ===
In November 1995, Karadžić and Mladić were indicted by the ICTY for their alleged direct responsibility for the war crimes committed against the Bosnian Muslim population of Srebrenica. In 1999, UN Secretary-General Kofi Annan submitted his report on the fall of Srebrenica. He acknowledged the international community as a whole had to accept its share of responsibility, for its response to the ethnic cleansing that culminated in the murder of 7,000 unarmed civilians from the town designated by the Security Council as a "safe area".

=== 2002: Dutch government report ===
The failure of Dutchbat to protect the enclave became a national trauma in the Netherlands and led to long-running discussions. In 1996, the Dutch government asked the NIOD Institute for War, Holocaust and Genocide Studies to research the events. The report was published in 2002—Srebrenica: a 'safe' area. It concluded the Dutchbat mission was not well considered and well-nigh impossible. The report is often cited; however, the Institute for War and Peace Reporting labelled it "controversial", as "the sheer abundance of information makes it possible for anyone to pluck from it whatever they need to make their point". One author claimed some sources were "unreliable", and only used to support another author's argument. Responding to the report, the Dutch government accepted partial political responsibility for the circumstances in which the massacre happened and the second Kok cabinet resigned.

=== 2002: First Republika Srpska report ===
In September 2002, the Republika Srpska Office of Relations with the ICTY issued the Report about Case Srebrenica. The document, by Darko Trifunović, was endorsed by leading Bosnian Serb politicians. It concluded that 1,800 Bosnian Muslim soldiers died during fighting and a 100 more from exhaustion. "The number of Muslim soldiers killed by Bosnian Serbs out of personal revenge or lack of knowledge of international law is probably about 100 ... It is important to uncover the names of the perpetrators to accurately and unequivocally establish whether or not these were isolated instances." The report examined the mass graves, claiming they were made for hygiene reasons, questioning the legitimacy of the missing person lists and undermining a key witness' mental health and military history. The International Crisis Group and UN condemned the manipulation of their statements.

=== 2003: Srebrenica Genocide Memorial ===
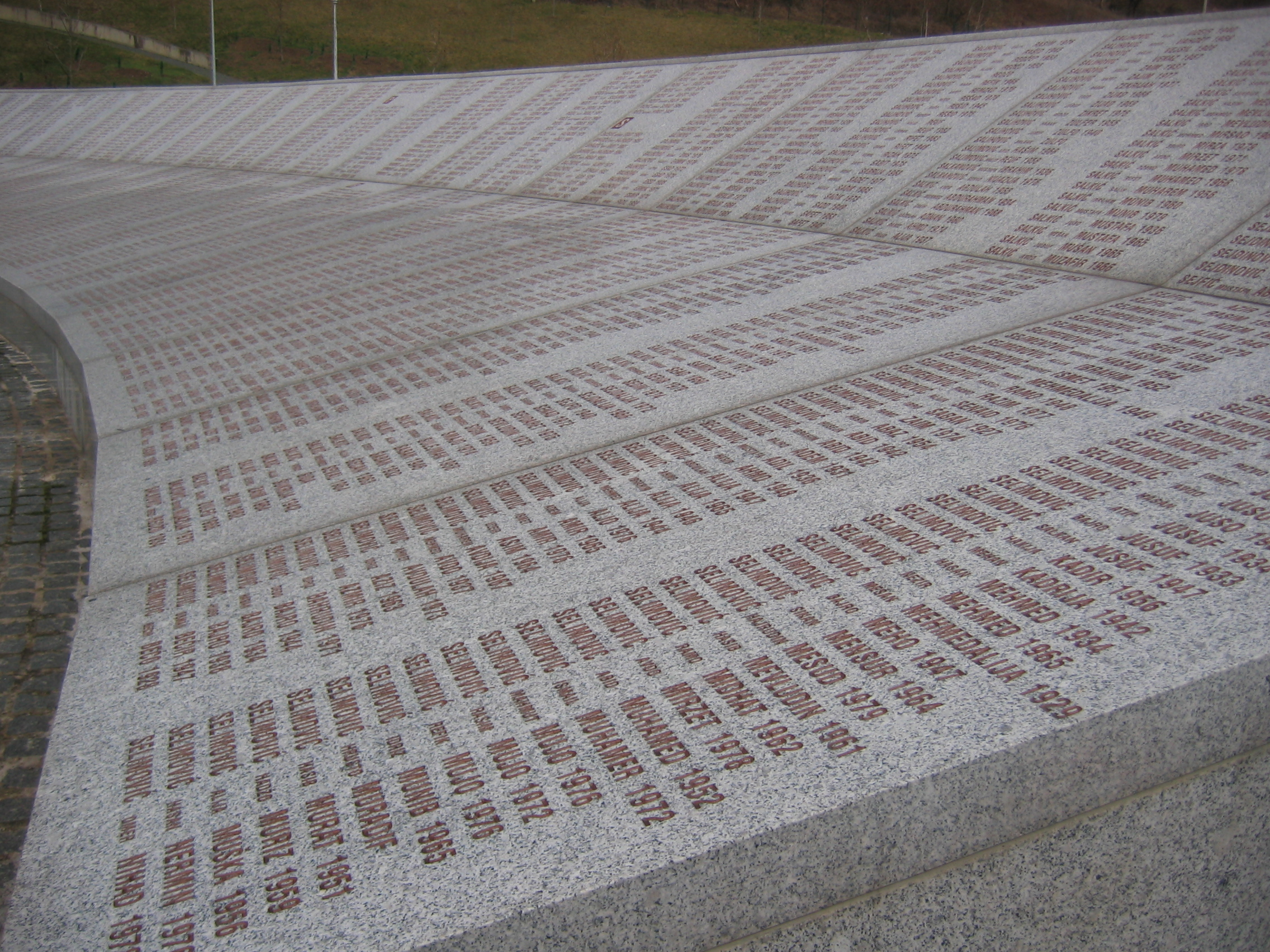
Wall of names at the Srebrenica Genocide Memorial

In September 2003, former US President Bill Clinton officially opened the Srebrenica Genocide Memorial to honour the victims of the genocide. The total cost was around $6 million. "We must pay tribute to the innocent lives, many of them children who were snuffed out in what must be called genocidal madness", Clinton said.

=== 2004: Second Republika Srpska report and apology ===
In March 2003, the Human Rights Chamber for Bosnia and Herzegovina directed the Republika Srpska (RS) to conduct a full investigation into the events at Srebrenica, and to report its results by September of that year. The Chamber had no power to implement the directive, after its dissolution in late 2003. The RS published reports in September 2003, which the Human Rights Chamber concluded did not fulfil the RS' obligations. In October 2003, the High Representative, Paddy Ashdown, lamented that "getting the truth from the [Bosnian Serb] government is like extracting rotten teeth". He did, however, welcome a recommendation to form an independent commission to investigate Srebrenica and issue a report within six months.

The Srebrenica Commission, officially named the Commission for Investigation of the Events in and around Srebrenica between 10 and 19 July 1995, was established in December 2003, and submitted its final report on 4 June 2004, and then an addendum in October 2004, after delayed information had been supplied. The report acknowledged men and boys were killed by Bosnian Serbs, citing a provisional figure of 7,800. Because of "limited time" and the need to "maximize resources", the commission "accepted the historical background and the facts stated in the second-instance judgment Prosecutor v. Radislav Krstić, when the ICTY convicted him for 'assisting and supporting genocide' in Srebrenica".

The findings remain disputed by Serb nationalists, who claim it was pressured by the High Representative, given the earlier RS government report which exonerated the Serbs was dismissed. Nevertheless, Dragan Čavić, the president of Republika Srpska, acknowledged in a televised address that Serb forces killed several thousand civilians in violation of international law, and asserted that Srebrenica was a dark chapter in Serb history. On 10 November 2004, the government of Republika Srpska issued an official apology. The statement came after a government review of the report. "The report makes it clear that enormous crimes were committed in the area of Srebrenica in July 1995. The Bosnian Serb Government shares the pain of the families of the Srebrenica victims, is truly sorry and apologises for the tragedy", the Bosnian Serb government said.

==== Republika Srpska Srebrenica Working Group ====
After a request by Ashdown, the RS established a working group to implement the recommendations of the report by the Srebrenica Commission. The group was to analyze the documentation in the report's confidential annexes and identify all possible perpetrators who were officials in RS institutions. A report on 1 April 2005 identified 892 such persons still employed by the RS, and the information was provided to the State Prosecutor of Bosnia and Herzegovina, with the understanding names would not be made public until official proceedings opened. On 4 October 2005, the working group said they had identified 25,083 people who were involved in the massacre, including 19,473 members of Bosnian Serb armed forces that actively gave orders or directly took part.

=== 2005: Release of Scorpions massacre video ===
On 1 June 2005, video evidence was introduced at the Slobodan Milošević trial to testify to the involvement of police from Serbia in the massacre. The video, the only undestroyed copy of 20 which had previously been available for rental in the Serbian town of Šid, was submitted to the ICTY by Nataša Kandić, director of the Belgrade-based Humanitarian Law Center.

The video shows an Orthodox priest blessing members of a Serbian unit known as the Scorpions. Later these soldiers are shown physically abusing civilians. The civilians were later identified as four minors as young as 16 and two men in their early twenties. The footage shows the execution of four of them and them lying dead in a field. The soldiers later order the two remaining captives to take the dead bodies into a nearby barn, after completing this, they are also killed.

The video caused outrage in Serbia. Following its showing, the Serbian government arrested some former soldiers identified on it. The event was covered by the Danas newspaper, and radio and television station B92. Nura Alispahić, mother of 16-year-old Azmir Alispahić, saw her son's execution on television. She said she was already aware of his death and had been told his body was burned following the execution; his remains were among those buried in Potočari in 2003. The executions took place on 16–17 July, in Trnovo, about 30 minutes from the Scorpions' base near Sarajevo.

On 10 April 2007, a special war crimes court in Belgrade convicted four former members of the Scorpions of war crimes, but concluded that the killings were isolated war crimes and that there was insufficient evidence to tie them to the Srebrenica genocide or to endorse allegations that the Scorpions were acting under the authority of the Serbian Interior Ministry (MUP).

=== 2005: 10th anniversary ===
In June 2005, the United States House of Representatives passed a resolution commemorating the 10th anniversary, by 370 to 1 (Ron Paul). It stated the "innocent people executed at Srebrenica ... should be solemnly remembered and honored; the policies ... implemented by Serb forces ... meet the terms ... in ... the Convention on the Prevention and Punishment of the Crime of Genocide." Missouri passed a resolution recognising the genocide and St. Louis issued a proclamation declaring 11 July Srebrenica Remembrance Day.

In his message to the commemoration, UN Secretary-General Kofi Annan paid tribute to the victims of "a terrible crime – the worst on European soil since the Second World War", on a date "marked as a grim reminder of man's inhumanity to man". He said the "first duty of the international community was to uncover and confront the full truth about what happened, a hard truth for those who serve the UN because great nations failed to respond adequately. There should have been stronger military forces in place, and a stronger will to use them". Annan added that the UN bore its share of responsibility, having made serious errors of judgement, "rooted in a philosophy of impartiality and non-violence which, however admirable, was unsuited to the conflict in Bosnia; because of that the tragedy of Srebrenica would haunt the UN's history forever". Bosnian Serb police found bombs at the memorial site, just days before the ceremony, when more than 50,000 people, including international politicians, were to attend. The bombs would have caused widespread loss of life.

=== 2006: Further mass graves and list of participants ===
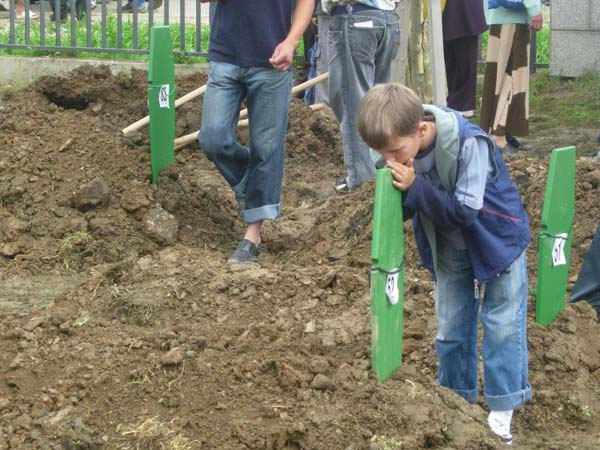
A boy at a grave during the 2006 funeral of genocide victims

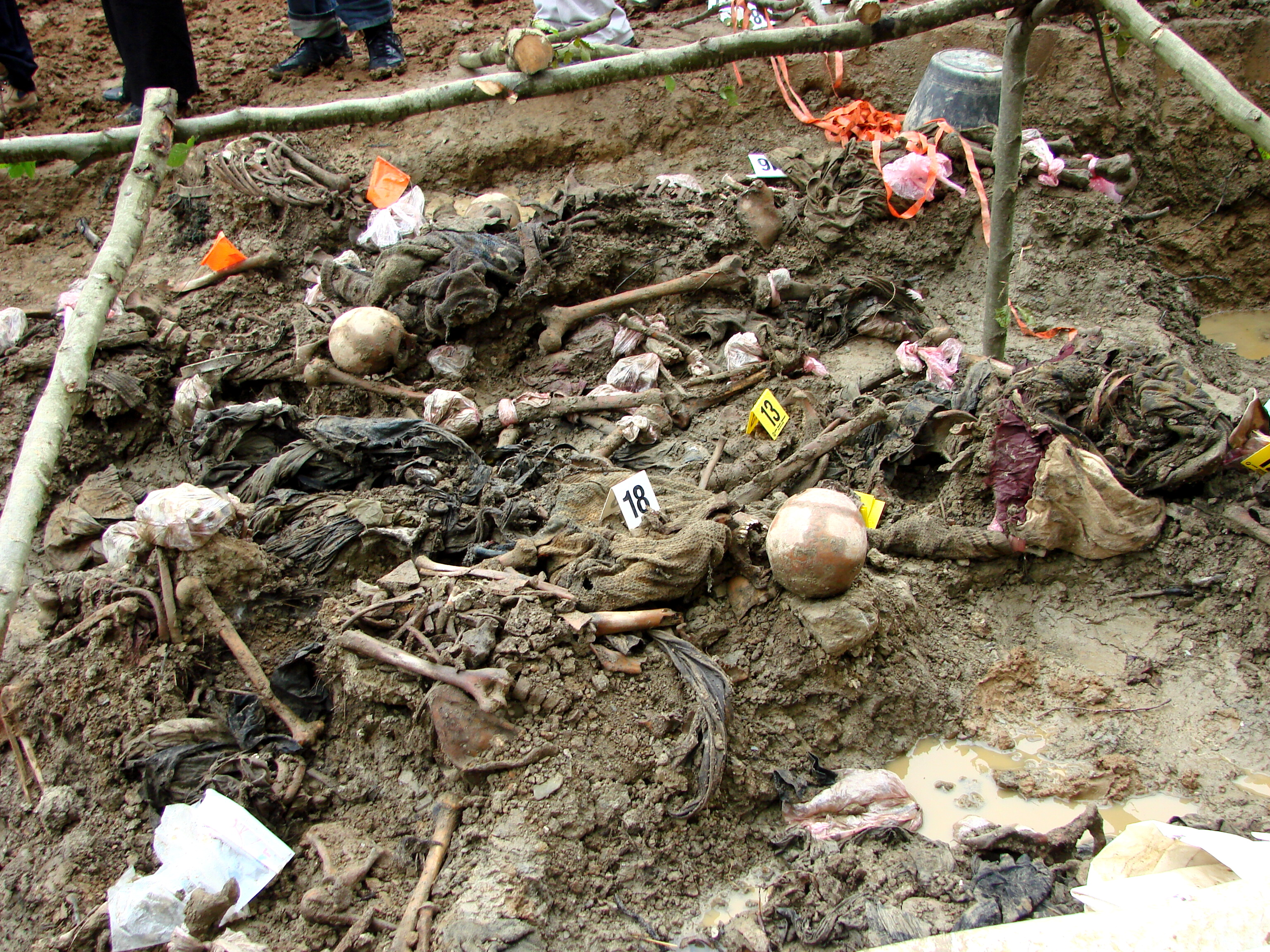
Exhumed grave, 2007

By 2006, 42 mass graves had been uncovered. 2,070 victims had been identified, while body parts in 7,000 bags awaited identification. In August 2006 over 1,000 body parts were exhumed from a mass grave in Kamenica.

In August 2006, Sarajevan newspaper Oslobođenje published a list of 892 Bosnian Serbs who had allegedly participated in the massacre and believed to still be employed by state institutions. They were listed among 28,000 Bosnian Serbs reported to have taken part by a Republika Srpska report. The list had been withheld from publication with the report, by the chief prosecutor of the Bosnian War Crimes Chamber, Marinko Jurčević who claimed "publishing this information might jeopardise the ongoing investigations".

In December 2006, the Dutch government awarded the Dutch UN peacekeepers an insignia because they believed they "deserved recognition for their behaviour in difficult circumstances", noting the limited mandate and ill-equipped mission. However, survivors and relatives called it a "humiliating decision" and responded with protest rallies in The Hague, Assen and Sarajevo.

=== 2007–08: Arrests of Tolimir and Karadžić ===
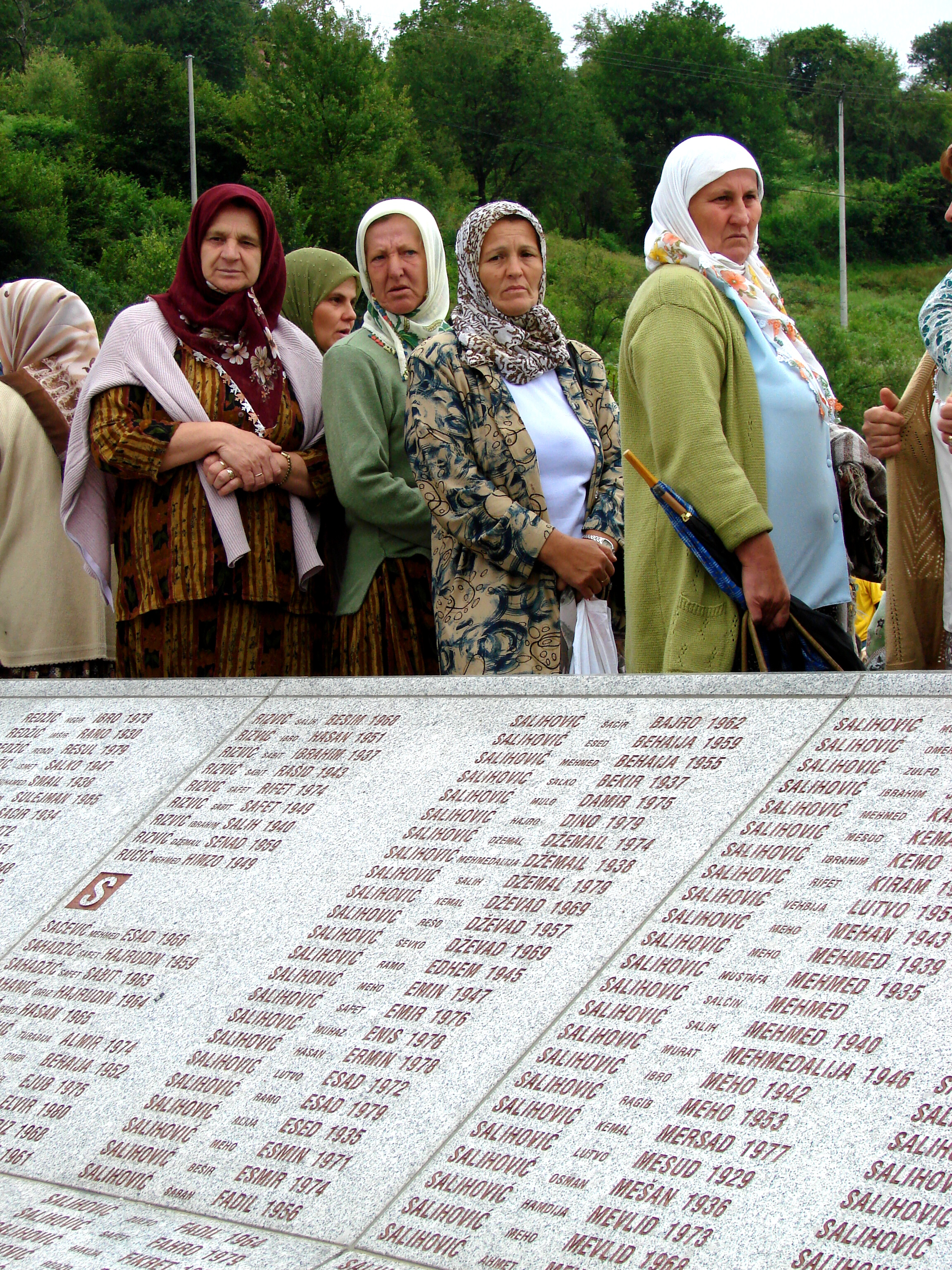
Women at the monument for victims, at the annual memorial ceremony in Potočari, 11 July 2007

In May 2007, former Bosnian Serb general Zdravko Tolimir was apprehended by police from Serbia and Republika Srpska. He was turned over to NATO forces at the Banja Luka International Airport where he was read the ICTY indictment and arrested. Mladić's deputy in charge of intelligence and security, and a key commander, Tolimir is believed to have been an organiser of the network protecting Mladić, helping him elude justice. Tolimir—"Chemical Zdravko"—is infamous for requesting the use of chemical weapons and proposing military strikes against refugees at Žepa. In June 2007, he was turned over to the ICTY. Radovan Karadžić, with similar charges, was arrested in Belgrade in 2008, after 13 years on the run, and brought before Belgrade's War Crimes Court.

=== 2009: EU Parliament resolution ===
On 15 January 2009, the European Parliament voted in favour of a resolution calling for recognition of 11 July as a day for EU commemoration of the genocide. Bosnian Serb politicians rejected it, stating such a commemoration is unacceptable to the Republika Srpska.

=== 2010 and 2013: Serbia's official apologies ===
In 2010, the Serbian Parliament passed a resolution condemning the massacre, and apologizing for Serbia not doing more to prevent it. The motion was passed narrowly with 127 out of 250 MPs voting in favour, with 173 legislators present. The Socialist Party of Serbia, formerly under Slobodan Milošević and under new leadership, voted for. Opposition parties claimed the text was "shameful", either stating the wording was too strong or too weak. Some victims' relatives were unhappy with the apology, as it did not use the word 'genocide', but rather pointed at the Bosnian genocide case ruling. President Boris Tadić said the declaration is the highest expression of patriotism and it represents distancing from the crimes. Sulejman Tihić, former Bosniak member of the Presidency of Bosnia and Herzegovina, stated that Bosnia and Herzegovina must adopt a similar resolution condemning crimes against Serbs and Croats. In April 2013, President Tomislav Nikolić stated: "I kneel and ask for forgiveness for Serbia for the crime committed in Srebrenica. I apologise for the crimes committed by any individual in the name of our state and our people."

=== 2010: Second Republika Srpska report revision ===
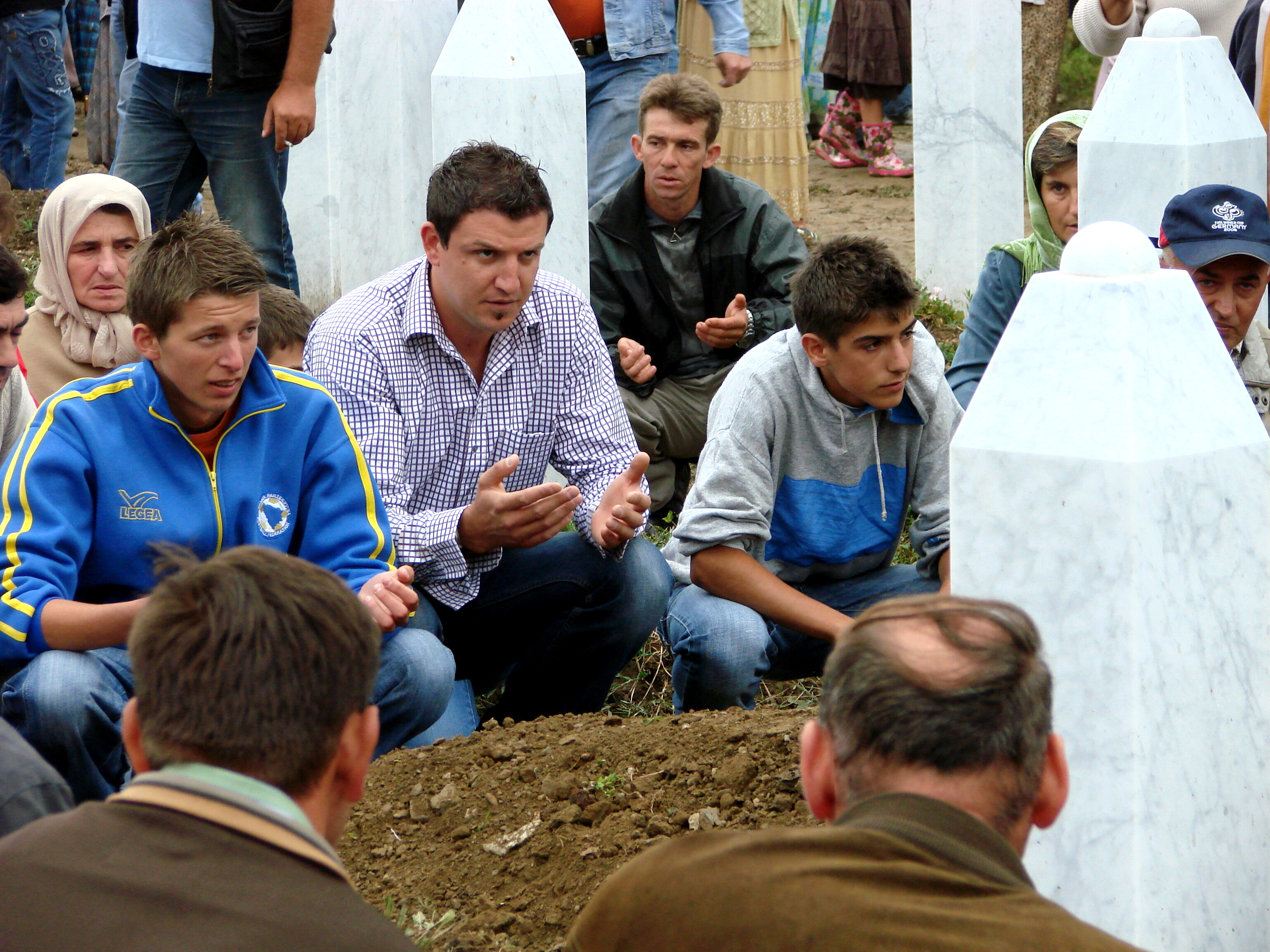
Bosniak mourners at the reburial ceremony for an exhumed victim of the Srebrenica massacre

On 21 April 2010, the government of Milorad Dodik, the prime minister of Republika Srpska, initiated a revision of the 2004 report saying the numbers killed were exaggerated and the report was manipulated by a former peace envoy. The Office of the High Representative responded by saying: "The Republika Srpska government should reconsider its conclusions and align itself with the facts and legal requirements and act accordingly, rather than inflicting emotional distress on the survivors, torture history and denigrate the public image of the country". On 12 July 2010, at the 15th anniversary, Milorad Dodik said he acknowledged the killings, but did not regard what happened as genocide.

=== 2011: Arrest of Mladić ===
In May 2011, Mladić was arrested in Lazarevo, Serbia after remaining at large for 16 years, sheltered by Serbian and Bosnian Serb security forces and family. His capture was considered to be a pre-condition for Serbia obtaining candidate status for EU membership.

=== 2015: Russia vetoes UN resolution ===
In July 2015, Russia vetoed a United Nations Security Council resolution that would have condemned the massacre as a genocide. It was intended to mark the 20th anniversary. China, Nigeria, Angola and Venezuela abstained and the remaining 10 members voted in favour. The veto was praised by Serbian President Tomislav Nikolić who said Russia had "prevented an attempt of smearing the entire Serbian nation as genocidal" and proven itself as a true and honest friend.

=== 2024: International Day of Commemoration ===
In May 2024, 11 July was designated as the annual International Day of Reflection and Commemoration of the 1995 Genocide in Srebrenica by United Nations General Assembly Resolution 78/282.

The UN resolution, which was sponsored by Germany and Rwanda, was passed with 84 countries voting for the resolution, 68 abstaining, and 19 voting against. Politico described Serbia launching a "full-blown diplomatic offensive" to block the initiative, with Serbian leaders staging multiple press conferences and visiting the UN headquarters to meet with key stakeholders to try to sway the vote.

== Victims ==
The Bosnian Book of the Dead documented 8,331 victims killed in the massacre. The figure includes 1,416 soldiers who were taken as prisoners of war, or 17%, meaning that 83% killed were civilians. Of the 8,331, 5,113 were from Srebrenica, 1,766 from Bratunac, 900 from Vlasenica, 437 from Zvornik and 115 from Rogatica/Žepa.

As of July 2020 the International Commission on Missing Persons (ICMP) had identified 6,993 persons missing from the fall of Srebrenica, mostly through analysing DNA profiles extracted from exhumed remains and matching them to profiles of relatives of the missing. The ICMP estimates total deaths was just over 8,000.

== Legal proceedings ==
=== International Criminal Tribunal for the former Yugoslavia ===
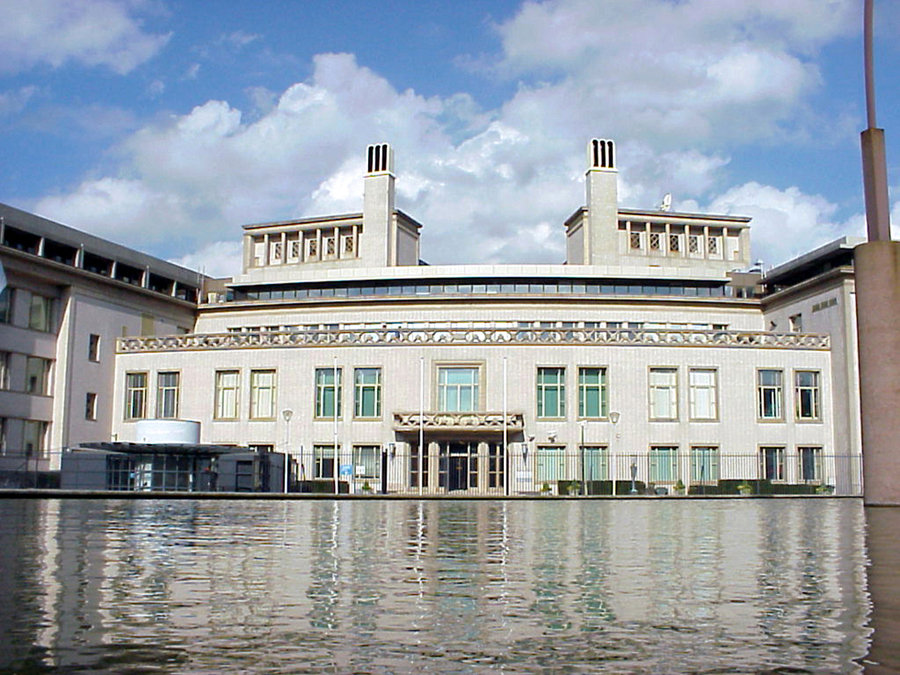
International Criminal Tribunal for the former Yugoslavia

In 1993, the UN Security Council established the International Criminal Tribunal for the former Yugoslavia (ICTY) to try those responsible for violations of international humanitarian law, including genocide.

The prosecution proved that genocide was committed in Srebrenica and that General Radislav Krstić, among others, was personally responsible for that.

— Olga Kavran ICTY Outreach Programme

General Radislav Krstić, who led the assault alongside Mladić, was convicted in 2001 of aiding and abetting genocide and received a sentence of 35 years. Colonel Vidoje Blagojević received 18 years for crimes against humanity. Krstić was the first European to be convicted of genocide since the Nuremberg trials, and only the third person convicted under the 1948 Genocide Convention. The ICTY's final ruling against Krstić, legally recognized the Srebrenica massacre, as an act of genocide:

By seeking to eliminate a part of the Bosnian Muslims, the Bosnian Serb forces committed genocide. They targeted for extinction the 40,000 Bosnian Muslims living in Srebrenica, a group which was emblematic of the Bosnian Muslims in general. They stripped all the male Muslim prisoners, military and civilian, elderly and young, of their personal belongings and identification, and deliberately and methodically killed them solely on the basis of their identity.

Milošević was accused of genocide, or complicity in genocide, including in Srebrenica, but died in 2006 during his trial. In June 2010, seven senior Serb military and police officers, Vujadin Popović, Ljubiša Beara, Drago Nikolić, Ljubomir Borovčanin, Vinko Pandurević, Radivoje Miletić and Milan Gvero, were found guilty of various crimes, including genocide. The former chief of the general staff of the Yugoslav Army, Momčilo Perišić, was sentenced to 27 years for aiding and abetting murder, because he provided salaries, ammunition, staff and fuel to the VRS officers. However, the evidence proved Perišić's inability to impose binding orders on Mladić. Zdravko Tolimir, a former general in the Army of the Republika Srpska, was accused of participating in the "criminal enterprise to remove the Muslim population" from Srebrenica and Žepa. He was convicted of genocide and sentenced to life imprisonment in 2012.

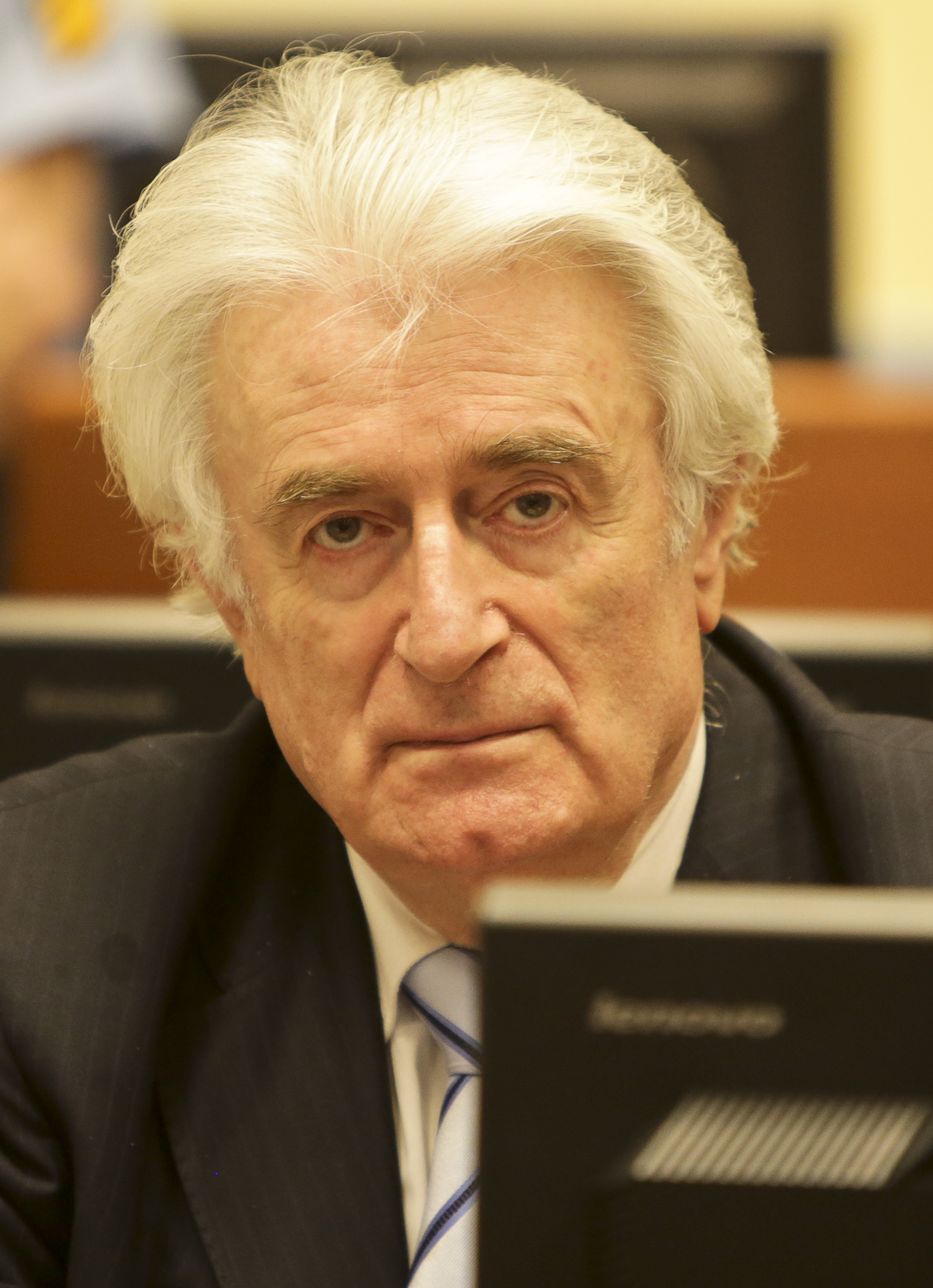
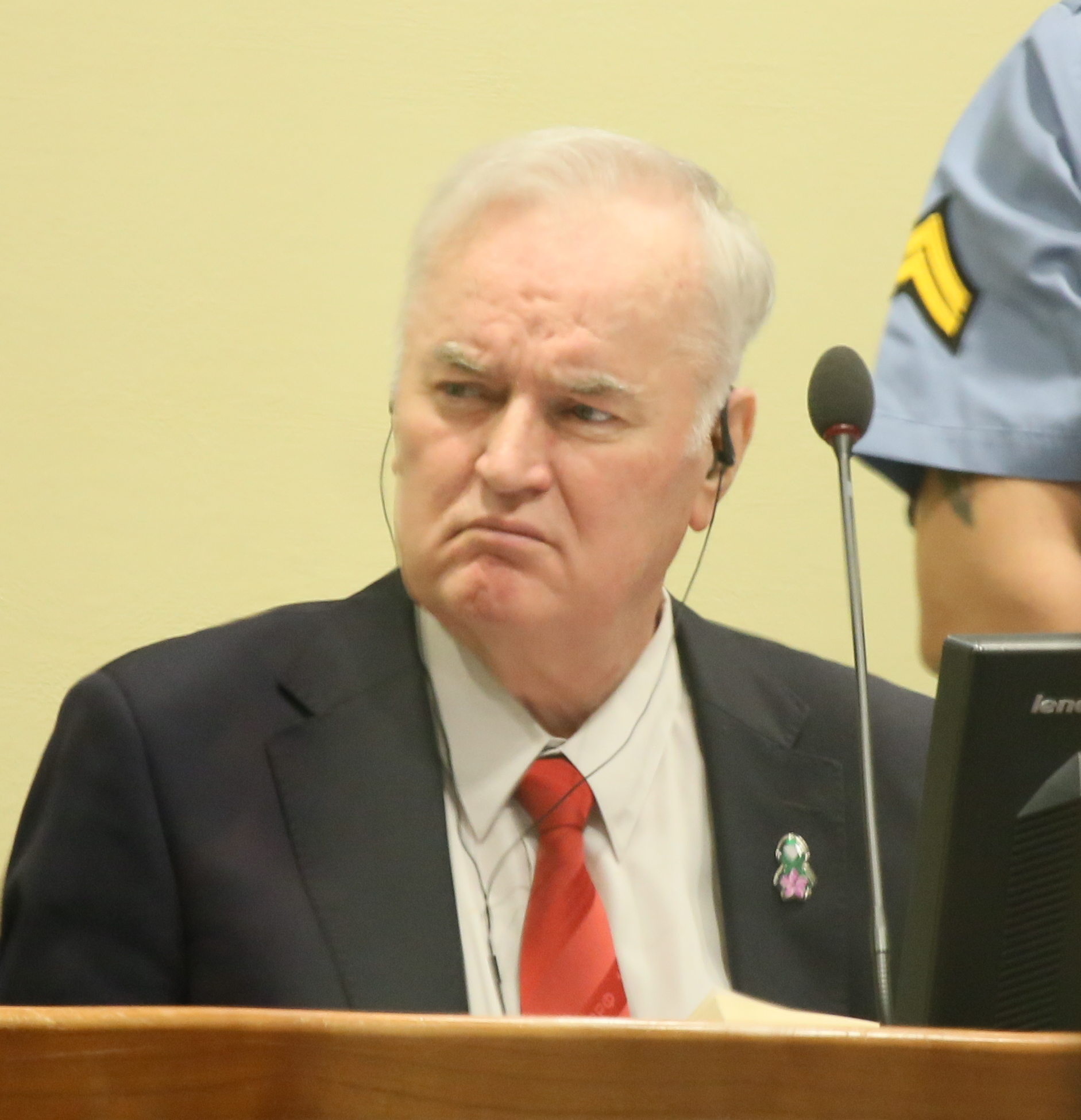
Radovan Karadžić (left), former president of Republika Srpska, and Ratko Mladić (right), former Chief of Staff of the Army of the Republika Srpska. Both were found guilty of genocide, war crimes and crimes against humanity, and sentenced to life imprisonment.

Radovan Karadžić and Ratko Mladić were indicted for genocide, and complicity in genocide, including in Srebrenica. The trial of Radovan Karadžić began in 2010, and in 2016 he was convicted of genocide in Srebrenica and other crimes; he was ultimately sentenced to life imprisonment. In 2017, the ICTY found Mladić guilty on 10 counts of war crimes, crimes against humanity and genocide, and sentenced him to life in prison. As the top military officer with command responsibility, Mladić was deemed responsible for the Srebrenica massacre.

In 2023, the follow-up International Residual Mechanism for Criminal Tribunals sentenced Serbian State Security officers Jovica Stanišić and Franko Simatović for aiding and abetting murder and persecution of six Bosniak men in Trnovo in 1995, through their control of Serb paramilitary, Scorpions, and sentenced each to 15 years. The Tribunal concluded:

...in July 1995, Slobodan Medić (Boca) was ordered to transport Muslims, including six Muslim men and boys, to various locations, to be killed. The Trial Chamber found proven beyond reasonable doubt that the Scorpions, acting upon the orders of Slobodan Medić (Boca), killed the six Muslim men and boys in the rural area at Godinjske Bare.

=== International Court of Justice ===
The Srebrenica genocide was the core issue of the landmark Bosnian genocide case at the International Court of Justice (ICJ) through which Bosnia and Herzegovina accused Serbia and Montenegro of genocide. The ICJ presented its judgement in February 2007, which concurred with ICTY's recognition of the Srebrenica massacre as genocide. It cleared Serbia of direct involvement, but ruled that Belgrade breached international law by failing to prevent the genocide, and failing to try or transfer the persons accused to the ICTY, under its obligations in the Genocide Convention, particularly in respect of Mladić. Citing national security, Serbia obtained permission from the ICTY to keep parts of its military archives out of the public eye during Milošević's trial. This may have decisively affected the ICJ's judgement in the lawsuit against Serbia, as the archives were not on the ICTY's public record – although the ICJ could have, but did not, subpoena the documents. The Chief prosecutor's office, rejected allegations there was a deal with Belgrade to conceal documents from the ICJ case.

=== National courts ===
==== Serbia ====
On 10 April 2007, a Serbian war crimes court sentenced four members of the Scorpions paramilitary group to a total of 58 years in prison for the execution of six Bosniaks during the Srebrenica massacre.

Guilty of war crimes

- Pera Petrašević – sentenced to 13 years
- Branislav Medić – sentenced to 15 years
- Aleksandar Medić – sentenced to five years

Acquitted

- Aleksandar Vukov

==== Bosnia and Herzegovina ====
The Kravica case was an important trial before the Court of Bosnia and Herzegovina; 11 men were accused of genocide. In July 2008, after a two-year trial, the court found seven of them guilty of genocide for their role in Srebrenica, including the deaths of 1,000 Bosniak men in a single day. Men trying to escape were told they would be kept safe if they surrendered. Instead, they were transported to an agricultural cooperative in Kravica, and executed.

Guilty of genocide

- Milenko Trifunović (commander of the 3rd "Skelani" Platoon, part of the 2nd Special Police Šekovići Squad) – sentenced to 42 years.
- Brano Džinić (special police force officer of the 2nd Special Police Šekovići Squad) – sentenced to 42 years.
- Slobodan Jakovljević (special police force member of the 3rd "Skelani" Platoon) – sentenced to 40 years.
- Branislav Medan (special police force member of the 3rd "Skelani" Platoon) – sentenced to 40 years.
- Petar Mitrović (special police force member of the 3rd "Skelani" Platoon) – sentenced to 38 years.
- Aleksandar Radovanović (special police force members of the 3rd "Skelani" Platoon) – sentenced to 42 years.
- Milorad Trbić (assistant commander for Security with the Zvornik Brigade of the Republika Srpska Army) found guilty on one count of genocide and sentenced to 30 years in jail.
- Radomir Vuković (special police force officer of the 2nd Special Police Šekovići Squad) – sentenced to 31 years.
- Zoran Tomić (special police force officer of the 2nd Special Police Šekovići Squad) – sentenced to 31 years.
- Marko Boškić (member of 10th Commando Squad of the Republika Srpska Army) – pleaded guilty, sentenced to 10 years.

Guilty of aiding and abetting genocide

- Duško Jević (deputy commander of the interior ministry special police brigade and commander of the Jahorina special police training center) – sentenced to 35 years.
- Mendeljev Đurić (commander of Jahorina special police training center's first company) – sentenced to 30 years.

Guilty of crimes against humanity and war crimes

- Stanko Kojić (member of the 10th Sabotage Unit of the Republika Srpska Army) – sentenced to 43 years.
- Franc Kos (commander of the First Platoon of the 10th Sabotage Unit of the Republika Srpska Army) – sentenced to 40 years.
- Zoran Goronja (member of the 10th Sabotage Unit of the Republika Srpska Army) – sentenced to 40 years.
- Vlastimir Golijan (member of the 10th Sabotage Unit of the Republika Srpska Army) – plead guilty, sentenced to 19 years.
- Dragan Crnogorac (police officer) – sentenced to 13 years.
- Božidar Kuvelja (Bosnian Serb police officer)- sentenced to 20 years.

Arrested

- On 12 September 2023, five Bosnian Serb ex-soldiers were arrested in Zvornik, Šekovići, Han Pijesak, Vlasenica, and Bileća for suspected involvement.

On trial

- Aleksa Golijanin

Acquitted

- Velibor Maksimović (special police force members of the 3rd "Skelani" Platoon)
- Milovan Matić (member of the Republika Srpska Army)
- Teodor Pavelvić (member of the Republika Srpska Army)
- Miladin Stevanović (special police force members of the 3rd "Skelani" Platoon)
- Dragiša Živanović (special police force members of the 3rd "Skelani" Platoon)
- Miloš Stupar (commander of the 2nd Special Police Šekovići Squad) – found guilty, sentenced to 40 years., later acquitted.
- Neđo Ikonić
- Goran Marković
- Dejan Radojković
- Aleksandar Cvetković (former member of the Tenth Reconnaissance Division of the Bosnian Serb Army). He was accused of taking part in the executions of 800 people, initiating use of machine guns to speed up killing.

Indictment dismissed on medical grounds

- Nedeljko Milidragović

==== Netherlands ====
Survivors and victims' relatives sought to establish the responsibility of the Netherlands and UN, in Dutch courts. In one case, 11 plaintiffs including Mothers of Srebrenica, asked the court to rule that the Netherlands and UN breached their obligation to prevent genocide and hold them jointly liable to pay compensation. In July 2008, the court ruled it had no jurisdiction against the UN; the plaintiffs appealed this ruling in relation to UN immunity.

Another action was brought by a former UN interpreter Hasan Nuhanović and the family of Rizo Mustafić, an electrician employed by the UN at Srebrenica. They claimed Dutch troops, responsible for security in the UN-protected zone, allowed VRS troops to kill Nuhanović's relatives and Mustafić. They argued the Dutch Government had de facto operational command, in accordance with the Dutch Constitution, which grants the government superior command over military forces. In September 2008, the district court dismissed these claims and held that the Netherlands could not be held responsible, because the Dutchbat peacekeepers were operating in Bosnia under a UN mandate and operational command had been transferred to the UN. In July 2011, the Dutch court of appeal reversed this and held that the state was responsible for, and indeed actively coordinated the evacuation once Srebrenica fell, and therefore responsible for the decision to dismiss Nuhanović's brother and Mustafić from the compound. The court held that this decision was wrong, because the Dutch soldiers should have known they were in great danger of being tortured or killed. Both claimants were therefore eligible for compensation. In September 2013, the Supreme Court of the Netherlands dismissed a government appeal, a judgment the government accepted. The court found it was the government which had "effective control" over its troops. The ruling meant relatives could pursue the government for compensation.

On 16 July 2014, a Dutch court held the Netherlands liable for the killings of more than 300 Bosniaks, who had been expelled from the compound and the state was not liable for other deaths. The decision was upheld by The Hague appeals court in 2017. On 19 July 2019, the Supreme Court ruled the Dutch state was liable for 10%, for the 350 Bosniak men expelled from the compound. The 10% liability was the court's assessment of the likelihood the soldiers could have prevented the killings.

== Analyses ==
=== Role of Bosnian forces ===
In response to the suggestion Bosniak forces in Srebrenica made no adequate attempt to defend the town, a report by the UN Secretary-General delivered to the United Nations General Assembly in 1999 states:

... military experts ... were largely in agreement that the Bosniaks could not have defended Srebrenica for long ... Many have accused the Bosniak forces of withdrawing from the enclave as the Serb forces advanced on the day of its fall. However ... the Dutchbat Commander urged the Bosniaks to withdraw from defensive positions south of Srebrenica town—the direction from which the Serbs were advancing ... because he believed that NATO aircraft would soon be launching widespread air strikes against the advancing Serbs. A third accusation levelled at the Bosniak defenders of Srebrenica is that they provoked the Serb offensive by attacking out of that safe area ... there is no credible evidence to support it. Dutchbat personnel on the ground at the time assessed that the few "raids" the Bosniaks mounted out of Srebrenica were of little or no military significance. These raids were often organised in order to gather food, as the Serbs had refused access for humanitarian convoys into the enclave. Even Serb sources ... acknowledged that the Bosniak forces in Srebrenica posed no significant military threat to them. The biggest attack the Bosniaks launched out of Srebrenica ... appears to have been the raid on the village of Višnjica, on 26 June 1995, in which several houses were burned, up to four Serbs were killed and approximately 100 sheep were stolen. In contrast, the Serbs overran the enclave two weeks later, driving tens of thousands from their homes, and summarily executing thousands of men and boys. The Serbs repeatedly exaggerated the extent of the raids out of Srebrenica as a pretext for the prosecution of a central war aim: to create a geographically contiguous and ethnically pure territory along the Drina, while freeing their troops to fight in other parts of the country. The extent to which this pretext was accepted at face value by international actors and observers reflected the prism of "moral equivalency" through which the conflict in Bosnia was viewed by too many for too long.

=== Disputed Serb casualties ===
Serbs suffered casualties during military forays led by Naser Orić. The controversy over the nature and number of casualties came to a head in 2005. According to Human Rights Watch, the ultra-nationalist Serbian Radical Party "launched an aggressive campaign to prove that Muslims had committed crimes against thousands of Serbs in the area" which "was intended to diminish the significance of the July 1995 crime." A briefing by the ICTY Office of the Prosecutor (OTP) from July 2005 noted Serb deaths in the region alleged by Serbian authorities had increased from 1,400 to 3,500, a figure the OTP stated does, "not reflect the reality." The briefing cited previous accounts:

- The Republika Srpska's Commission for War Crimes gave the number of Serb victims as 995; 520 in Bratunac and 475 in Srebrenica.
- The Chronicle of Our Graves by Milivoje Ivanišević, president of the Belgrade Centre for Investigating Crimes Committed against the Serbs, estimated around 1,200.
- For the Honourable Cross and Golden Freedom, a book published by the RS Ministry of Interior, referred to 641 Serb victims

The accuracy of these numbers is challenged: the OTP noted that although Ivanišević's book estimated around 1,200 Serbs were killed, personal details were only available for 624. The validity of labeling some casualties as "victims" is also challenged: studies have found a significant majority of military, compared to civilian casualties. This is in line with the nature of the conflict—Serb casualties died in raids by Bosniak forces on outlying villages used as military outposts for attacks on Srebrenica. For example, Kravica was attacked by Bosniak forces on Orthodox Christmas Day, 7 January 1993. Some Serb sources, such as Ivanišević, allege the village's 353 inhabitants were "virtually completely destroyed". In fact, VRS' own records state 46 Serbs died, while the OTP's investigation also found 43 people were killed. Nevertheless, the event continues to be cited by Serb sources as the key example of crimes committed by Bosniak forces around Srebrenica. As for casualties in Kravica, Šiljković, Bjelovac, Fakovići and Sikirić, the judgement states that the prosecution failed to present convincing evidence the Bosnian forces were responsible, because the Serb forces used artillery in the fighting in those villages. In the case of Bjelovac, Serbs even used warplanes. Another analysis was by the Research and Documentation Center in Sarajevo, a non-partisan institution, whose data have been evaluated by international experts. Its review found Serb casualties in the Bratunac municipality amounted to 119 civilians and 424 soldiers. It established that, although the 383 Serb victims buried in the Bratunac military cemetery are presented as casualties of ARBiH units from Srebrenica, 139, about a third, had fought and died elsewhere.

Serb sources maintain that casualties prior to the creation of the safe area gave rise to Serb demands for revenge against the Bosniaks based in Srebrenica. The ARBiH raids are presented as a key motivating factor for the genocide. This view is echoed by international sources, including the 2002 report commissioned by the Netherlands. Paul Mojzes notes much animosity towards the men of Srebrenica stems from May 1992 to January 1993, where forces under Orić's leadership attacked and destroyed scores of Serbian villages. Evidence indicated Serbs had been tortured, mutilated and others burned alive, when their houses were torched.

The efforts to explain the massacre as motivated by revenge have been dismissed as bad faith attempts to justify the genocide. The ICTY Outreach Programme notes that the claim Bosnian Serb forces killed the prisoners, in revenge for crimes by Bosnian Muslims, provides no defence under law.

=== Lack of military logic ===
During Radislav Krstić's trial, the prosecution's military advisor, Richard Butler, pointed out that by carrying out a mass execution, the Serb Army deprived themselves of an extremely valuable bargaining counter. Butler suggested that they would have had far more to gain had they taken the men in Potočari as prisoners of war, under the supervision of the International Committee of the Red Cross and UN troops. It might then have been possible to enter into an exchange deal or they might have been able to force political concessions. Based on this reasoning, the ensuing mass murder defied military explanation.

=== Dutchbat ===
Brigadier General Hagrup Haukland was UNPROFOR's commander of the sector in which the killings started on 11 July, when he was on vacation. His subordinate, Colonel Brantz, phoned Haukland twice on 9 July about the crisis. Confusion within Haukland's staff has been attributed in part, to him being slow to return to his place of work. The 2002 report Srebrenica: a 'safe' area, and a military advisor, said "The cadres consisted of clans of Norwegian, Pakistani and Dutch military that were incapable of adequate mutual cooperation." The report did not assign any blame to Haukland for the massacre. In 2005 an unnamed officer on Haukland's staff, disputed the claim by Haukland and Norway's Chief of Defence, Arne Solli, that the attack was a surprise. The officer said "We knew early on that the Serbs were amassing their forces around Srebrenica. At the end of June, Haukland informed the headquarters at Sarajevo again and again...". In 2006 it was reported Haukland regularly informed Sollie about...Haukland's sector, and when Haukland departed Bosnia on his vacation to Norway, they travelled on the same plane.

In 2010, John Sheehan, NATO's Supreme Allied Commander Atlantic (1994–97), told the US Senate that the Dutch had "made a conscious effort to socialise their military...it includes open homosexuality", claiming gay soldiers could result in events like Srebrenica. He claimed his opinion was shared by Dutch military leadership, mentioning "Hankman Berman", who Sheehan said had told him the presence of gay soldiers had contributed to the disaster. General Henk van den Breemen denied saying this and called Sheehan's comments "total nonsense"; the Dutch authorities described them as "disgraceful" and "unworthy of a soldier". Sheehan apologised to Dutch military officials and blamed instead "the rules of engagement...developed by a political system with conflicting priorities and an ambivalent understanding of how to use the military."

=== Criticism of the UN Special Representative ===
The Dutch government report from 2002, Srebrenica: a 'safe' area, criticised the choice of Thorvald Stoltenberg as a mediator. In 2005, Professor Arne Johan Vetlesen said, "Thorvald Stoltenberg's co-responsibility in Srebrenica boils down to the fact that, over three years as a top mediator, he helped to create a climate—diplomatically, politically and indirectly militarily—that was such that Mladić calculated correctly, when he figured he could do exactly as he wanted with Srebrenica's Muslim population".

== Denial ==
Scepticism has ranged from challenging judicial recognition of the killings as genocide, to the denial of a massacre having taken place. The finding of genocide by the ICJ and ICTY has been disputed on evidential and theoretical grounds. The number of the dead has been questioned as has the nature of their deaths. It has been alleged that considerably fewer than 8,000 were killed and/or that most died in battle, rather than execution. It has been claimed the interpretation of "genocide" is refuted by the survival of the women and children.

In the Radislav Krstić judgment, the Appeals Chamber found:

The decision not to kill the women or children may be explained by the Bosnian Serbs' sensitivity to public opinion. In contrast to the killing of the captured military men, such an action could not easily be kept secret, or disguised as a military operation, and so carried an increased risk of attracting international censure… The international attention focused on Srebrenica, combined with the presence of UN troops in the area, prevented those members of the VRS Main Staff who devised the genocidal plan from putting it into action in the most direct and efficient way. Constrained by the circumstances, they adopted the method which would allow them to implement the genocidal design while minimizing the risk of retribution."

Moreover, as the trial itself had emphasized, the description of those killed by the VRS as being "men of military age" was itself a "misnomer" as included were "boys and elderly men normally considered to be outside that range".

During the war, Milošević had effective control of most Serbian media. Following its end, denial of Serbian responsibility for the killings was widespread among Serbians. Sonja Biserko and Edina Bečirević, have pointed to a culture of denial of the genocide in Serbian society.

== See also ==
- 12 April 1993 Srebrenica shelling
- A Cry from the Grave
- Dubh (ar thitim Shrebenice, 11ú Iúil, 1995) poem
- The Enclave
- "Nož, žica, Srebrenica"
- Overture
- Persecution of Muslims
- Propaganda during the Yugoslav Wars
- Quo Vadis, Aida?
- Serbian war crimes in the Yugoslav Wars
- Silvertown
- The Srebrenica Tape
- A Town Betrayed
- Zaklopača massacre
