= Naser Orić =

Bosnian military officer (born 1967)

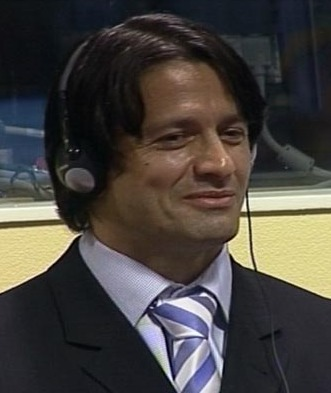
- Orić at the ICTY in 2008
- Born: 3 March 1967 (age 59); Donji Potočari, Srebrenica, SR Bosnia and Herzegovina, SFR Yugoslavia
- Military career
- Allegiance: Yugoslavia; Bosnia and Herzegovina
- Service years: 1992–1995
- Rank: Brigadier
- Unit: 28th Division (2nd Corps)
- Commands: Commander in Srebrenica
- Conflicts: Bosnian War; Kalesija and Kamenica offensive; Attack on Kravica; Operation Cerska '93; Siege of Srebrenica

Naser Orić (born 3 March 1967) is a former Bosnian officer who commanded Army of the Republic of Bosnia and Herzegovina (ARBiH) forces in the Srebrenica enclave in eastern Bosnia surrounded by Bosnian Serb forces, during the Bosnian War.

In 2006, he was sentenced to two years imprisonment by the Trial Chamber of the International Criminal Tribunal for the former Yugoslavia (ICTY) in the Netherlands for failing to prevent the deaths of five Bosnian Serb detainees and the mistreatment of eleven other detainees from late 1992 to early 1993 on the basis of superior criminal responsibility.

Orić was acquitted on other charges of wanton destruction and causing damage to civilian infrastructure beyond the realm of military necessity. On 3 July 2008, the Appeals Chamber of the ICTY reversed the Trial Chamber's conviction and acquitted Orić of all charges brought against him. In November 2018, he was formally acquitted by a Bosnian appeals court.

== Early life ==
Naser Orić was born on 3 March 1967 in Donji Potočari, about 3 kilometres (1.9 mi) from the town of Srebrenica to Džemal and Hata. His grandfather had fought with the Ustaše, an ultranationalist movement, during World War II. Orić graduated from high school with a metalworking certificate.

== Career ==
Orić was conscripted into the Yugoslav People's Army (JNA) in 1985/1986, where he served in a special unit for atomic and chemical defence. He left the JNA with the rank of corporal. In 1988, he completed a six-month training course in Zemun and served in Savski Venac in Belgrade as a trainee policeman. As a member of the police unit for special actions, he had courses for two more years. He was occasionally deployed to Kosovo and worked as a bodyguard for Slobodan Milošević when required. He guarded Milošević during the celebration of the 600th anniversary of the Battle of Kosovo at Gazimestan in Kosovo Polje in June 1989, when the Serbian president delivered a speech in front of hundreds of thousands of Serbs. Orić says he did not speak to Milošević when he guarded him, but says he did meet and talk with him years later when the two were both on trial at the Hague, remarking that Milošević acted "like a gentleman" and even gave him gifts.

In 1990, Orić was deployed to Kosovo as a member of a Special Police unit of the Ministry of the Interior of the Socialist Republic of Serbia. Thereafter, he returned to Belgrade. He worked in quelling the civil unrest during the March 1991 mass anti-war protests, arresting Vuk Drašković. During that time he also worked as a bouncer at the famous Belgrade nightclub Metro (formerly Zvezda) in Knez Mihailova Street. In August 1991, Orić was transferred to a police station in Ilidža, outside Sarajevo. He was moved to the police station in Srebrenica in late 1991. In April 1992 he became the police chief of the Potočari police sub-station.

=== Territorial Defence (April 1992–September 1992) ===
With the disintegration of the Socialist Federal Republic of Yugoslavia, a cadre staff consisting of former JNA officers began to prepare for the defence of Bosnia and Herzegovina. On 8 April 1992, the Presidency of Bosnia and Herzegovina transformed the existing Territorial Defense of the Socialist Republic of Bosnia and Herzegovina into the Territorial Defence of Bosnia and Herzegovina.

In mid-April 1992, the Potočari TO was established, and Orić became its Commander. In May 1992, members of the Crisis Staff of the TO Srebrenica appointed him as the Commander, which Sefer Halilović, Chief of the Supreme Command Staff of the Army of the Republic of Bosnia and Herzegovina (ARBiH), officially confirmed in June. Orić also became a member of the War Presidency in Srebrenica upon its creation on 1 July.

=== Army of Bosnia and Herzegovina (September 1992–1995) ===
In September, 1992, the Srebrenica TO HQ was renamed the HQ Srebrenica Armed Forces. Orić remained the commander. Orić's command was further extended when he was appointed the Commander of the Joint Armed Forces of the Sub-Region Srebrenica in early November 1992. Now his command encompassed the geographical regions of several municipalities: Srebrenica, Bratunac, Vlasenica and Zvornik in Eastern Bosnia. Orić received a Certificate of Merit in April 1993.

On New Year's Day 1994, all units under the command of Orić were named the 8th Operative Group Srebrenica HQ, 2nd (Tuzla) Corps of the ABiH. On 12 July 1994, Orić was promoted to the rank of Brigadier, and sometime before the first of March he was awarded the Order of the Golden Lily, the highest award given by the Chief of Staff of the Supreme Command of the ARBiH. In early 1995, the 8th Operative Group Srebrenica HQ was renamed the ABiH 2nd Corps 28th Mountain Division.

== Orić in Srebrenica 1992–1995 ==
=== Background ===
In 1990, the League of Communists of Yugoslavia that ruled the Socialist Federal Republic of Yugoslavia (SFRY) dissolved. Ethnically defined political parties emerged in Bosnia and Herzegovina (BiH), which was one of the six republics that once constituted SFRY, and fought over BiH's future. In November 1991, a Bosnian Serb plebiscite reflected support for BiH to remain within the SFRY. However, an overwhelming majority of Bosnian Muslims and Bosnian Croats voted for BiH independence, in the next few months.

=== Beginning of the war in Srebrenica ===
Srebrenica, and the surrounding Central Podrinje region, held immense strategic importance to both the Serbs and the Bosniaks during the ensuing Bosnian war.

Srebrenica was a focal point in the Serb strategy and was gradually isolated by the Serb forces in 1992. By April 1992, the Yugoslav People's Army (JNA) had set up artillery at all strategic points surrounding Srebrenica. In 1992, Bosniak villages around Srebrenica were under attacks by Serb forces. According to the Naser Orić trial judgement:

"Between April 1992 and March 1993, Srebrenica town and the villages in the area held by Bosnian Muslims were constantly subjected to Serb military assaults, including artillery attacks, sniper fire, as well as occasional bombing from aircraft. Each onslaught followed a similar pattern. Serb soldiers and paramilitaries surrounded a Bosnian Muslim village or hamlet, called upon the population to surrender their weapons, and then began shelling and shooting. In most cases, they then entered the village or hamlet, expelled or killed the Bosniak forces, who offered no significant resistance. Meanwhile, in a number of villages around Srebrenica the Bosniak population began to organize local resistance groups.

From April 1992 onward, Naser Orić personally led a group of 20-30 Bosnian Muslim fighters from his native Potočari, a village about four kilometres northeast of Srebrenica. Orić was chief of the Potočari police sub-station and his group was involved in holding the front line and resisting Serb attacks on Potočari.

On April 18, 1992, Srebrenica fell to the Bosnian Serbs. However, Naser Orić and a handful of lightly armed fighters based in Potočari ambushed and killed a number of Serb paramilitaries. On 6 May, Bosniaks led by Naser Orić carried out their first attack on a village, Gniona, to the north of the town of Srebrenica in which some Serb civilians were massacred. On May 8, 1992, a leader of the Serb forces at Srebrenica, Goran Zekić was killed in an ambush. At around the same time, the Serb forces retreated from Srebrenica and Naser Orić, together with other Bosnian Muslim fighters and civilians reoccupied Srebrenica.

From May 1992 to January 1993, forces under Orić's leadership attacked and destroyed scores of Serbian villages. Evidence indicated Serbs had been tortured, mutilated and others burned alive, while their houses were torched.

The Prosecution at the ICTY alleged that between September 24, 1992 and March 20, 1993, the military police, under Orić's command and control, subjected several Serb individuals to physical abuse, serious suffering and injury to body and health, inhumane treatment, and in some cases, murder. However, Orić was acquitted of these charges by the ICTY Appeals Chamber, who found that there is insufficient evidence to hold Orić responsible for the crimes with which he was charged.

Bosnian Serb forces committed a massacre in the village of Glogova on 9 May, which resulted in the deaths of 64 Bosniak civilians. On 12 July 1992, 69 Bosnian Serb soldiers and civilians were killed in the villages of Zalazje and Sase in the municipality of Srebrenica, and Biljača and Zagoni in the municipality of Bratunac, after an attack by the ARBiH led by Orić.

General Philippe Morillon of France, Commander of the United Nations Protection Force (UNPROFOR), visited Srebrenica in March 1993. By then the town was overcrowded and siege conditions prevailed. There was almost no running water as the advancing Serb forces had destroyed the town’s water supplies; people relied on makeshift generators for electricity, and food, medicine and other essentials were extremely scarce. Before leaving, General Morillon told the panicked residents of Srebrenica at a public gathering that the town was under the protection of the UN and that he would never abandon them.

=== The attacks ===
The attacks under Orić's command mentioned in the ICTY indictment, by Deputy Prosecutor David Tolbert, are listed below:

- 15–20 May, the villages of Viogor, Orahovica and Osredak were attacked. The main objective of these attacks was to link up various Bosniak resistance centers around Srebrenica.
- 21-27 June, the villages of Ratkovici, Bradjevina, Ducici, and Gornji Ratkovici were attacked by Orić's forces. The objective of the attack was reportedly to prevent further shelling of Srebrenica enclave.
- 8 August, the villages of Jezestica and Bozici were attacked by forces under the command of Naser Orić after repelling an attack of Serb paramilitary known as Panteri.
- 24 September, the village of Podravanje, which was on the road between Srebrenica and Žepa, was attacked. 19 Serbs were reportedly killed.
- 26 September, Orić's forces attacked the villages of Nedeljista and Rogosija near Milici after repelling an attack by Serbs.
- 5 October, Orić attacked Fakovici and other villages along the river Drina. According to a Dutch government report (NIOD report), Orić's forces killed at least 24 Serb soldiers and burned down 36 buildings. Serbs at the other (i.e. Serbian) side of the Drina were involved in skirmishes as well. The report states that Serbs were using small boats as platforms for machineguns.
- 6 November, Bosniak forces, led by Orić, attacked and captured the village of Kamenica (Bosnia and Herzegovina).
- 14-19 December, Bosnian Army and irregulars under the command of Orić attacked the villages of Bjelovac, Voljavica, Loznica, and Sikirić after an attack by the Serb Army.
- 7 January 1993 (Orthodox Christmas Day), Bosniak forces under Orić captured the Serb villages of Kravica, Siljkovici and Jezestica. An estimated 25 VRS troops and eleven civilians were killed in the attack. The attack was reportedly in response to shelling by Serb forces.
- 16 January 1993, Orić attacked the village of Skelani, on the border with Serbia, killing at least 40 Serbs.

=== UN Safe Area ===
On 10 January 1993 the Bosnian Serb military commander Ratko Mladić launched a full-scale offensive against Srebrenica. On 17 April 1993, the city was made a safe haven by the United Nations, while fighting between Serb forces and Orić's units in Srebrenica continued with the Serbs retaking much of the territory lost during 1992.

In July 1995, the partially disarmed "UN safe area" was ultimately overrun by the Bosnian Serb Army, resulting in the Srebrenica massacre. Orić, along with rest of the command staff of 8th OG, was evacuated by helicopter in May 1995 two months prior to the fall of the enclave.

== ICTY war crimes trial ==
After the Dayton Peace Accords, Orić opened a fitness club in Tuzla. In a post-war TV interview, he stated "It's a fact that I was one of the main commanders in Srebrenica and, if I have to answer to someone, I'll answer; but I'd first have to bring up the time, space and situation in which we lived, as well as what the Serbs did to us compared to what we did to them. If Naser has to answer to someone, I'm right here and I'm not running away from responsibility, I'm not running away from the court, I'm not running away from the Hague or anyone. You just have to call on me and no problem."

An indictment at the ICTY against Orić was submitted on 17 March 2003 and confirmed on 28 March. He was indicted on two counts of individual responsibility and four counts of command responsibility for violations of the laws or customs of war, and was arrested at his club by SFOR on 10 April 2003 and transferred to the Hague the next day. Orić appeared before the court on 15 April and pleaded "not guilty" to all the counts of the indictment. He was denied a provisional release on 25 July 2003 and was held at the ICTY from 11 April 2003 until 30 June 2006.

=== The indictment ===
Orić was accused of torture and cruel treatment of eleven and killing of seven Serb men being detained in the Srebrenica police station in 1992/1993, and to punish the perpetrators thereof. He was also accused of having ordered (and led) numerous guerrilla raids into as many as 50 Serb-populated villages in 1992–1993, particularly in the municipalities of Bratunac and Srebrenica. Bosnian Serb buildings, dwellings, and other property in predominantly Serb villages, were burnt and destroyed, hundreds of Serbs were murdered, and thousands of ethnic Serbs fled the area.

=== The trial ===
The trial began on 6 October 2004 and the prosecution completed its case on 31 May 2005. A week later the tribunal dropped two of the counts against him, withdrew all allegation of plundering public and private property; the tribunal also dropped two villages from the list of alleged raids.

The defense case commenced on 4 July 2005 and ended on 10 April 2006. The prosecution asked for an eighteen-year prison term, while the defense asked for an acquittal. In all there were 196 trial days, 83 witnesses testifying (52 called by prosecution, 30 by defense and 1 by the trial chamber) and 1,649 exhibits presented as evidence. The decision in the case was delivered on 30 June 2006.

=== The verdict ===
The ICTY convicted Orić for failing to prevent the murder and inhumane treatment of Serb prisoners. Orić, sentenced to two years in prison, was released immediately for time already served. He was acquitted of direct involvement in the murder or cruel treatment of Serbs, and of responsibility for the "wanton destruction" of homes and property.

The judges noted that militarily superior Serb forces encircled the town and that there was an unmanageable influx of refugees there, as well as a critical shortage of food and the breakdown of law and order. The judges also noted that it was in those circumstances, Orić, then 25, was elected commander of a poorly trained volunteer force that lacked effective links with government forces in Sarajevo. His authority was scorned by some other Bosnian leaders and his situation became worse as the Serb forces increased the momentum of their siege.

The judges stated in the verdict that Orić had reason to know about murder and cruel treatment of Serbs on two specific occasions in the police station but acquitted him of all other crimes. Orić was acquitted of direct involvement in the murder of prisoners in the early years of the Bosnian War, but the court found he had closed his eyes to their mistreatment and failed to punish their killers. The three judges acquitted him of all charges related to the wanton destruction of Serb villages. The judges also took into account the lack of food and supplies and resulting lack of order and law during the Serbian siege on Srebrenica.

As for the destruction in the villages of Kravica, Bjelovac, Fakovići and Sikirić, the judgment stated that "the accused and members of his group of fighters participated in the attack." In the case of the village of Šiljkovići, the court stated that "there is evidence to establish that property was destroyed on a large scale."

=== The appeal ===
On 31 July 2006, UN chief prosecutor Carla del Ponte announced she would appeal against the two-year sentence, saying it was too short. Orić's lawyer said she would also launch an appeal, saying her client did not commit any crime and should be acquitted.

== After 2006 release from imprisonment ==
As Orić had already spent more than two years in detention, following his trial he was released. He arrived at Sarajevo International Airport on 1 July 2006. On 4 July, he gave an interview to the Sarajevo daily Dnevni Avaz in which he stated among other things that the atmosphere in the ICTY detention unit was jovial and that there was no hostility between the inmates who were former war time adversaries. Orić said he passed the time by working out and learning English. He added that he believed that the behavior of an indictee in the detention unit and in the courtroom would reflect the severity of the prison term one would receive.

Naser Orić was arrested on 3 October 2008 by Bosnian police. He was charged in November 2008 with extorting 240,000 Bosnian Marks ($157,000) and illegal possession of weapons and ammunition. In July 2009 he was found guilty of illegal possession of weapons and ammunition but acquitted of extortion, and sentenced to two years in prison by a Sarajevo court. The sentence was subsequently reduced to four years probation and he was pardoned by the Bosnian Federation Presidency in 2012.

=== 2015 imprisonment in Switzerland and extradition on new charges ===
On 2 February 2014, Interpol National Central Bureau for Serbia issued an arrest warrant for Naser Orić at the request of the Serbian Justice Ministry on suspicion of war crimes against civilian populations in the villages around the Srebrenica municipality in July 1992.

Swiss border police arrested him on 10 June 2015 on the French-Swiss border based on a warrant from Serbia. Reactions came from the Bosniak-dominated government of Bosnia and Herzegovina, and organisations which support his innocence. The Bosnian government saw this as an attack by Serbia to cause tensions a month before the 20th anniversary of the Srebrenica genocide.

In 2015, the mayor of the Srebrenica municipality, Ćamil Duraković, ordered, with the agreement of local authorities, a delay of the marking of the 20th anniversary of the genocide, if Orić were transferred to Serbian authorities.

The warrant by the Serbian prosecution alleges that Orić and Bosnian Army soldier Sabahudin Muhić killed three Bosnian Serb prisoners of war in the villages of Zalazje, Lolici and Kunjerac in 1992, three years before the infamous 1995 attack on Srebrenica. He was, however, extradited to Bosnia and Herzegovina, not Serbia. In 2018 the State Court of Sarajevo acquitted him.
