= July 1992 killings of Serbs in Bratunac and Srebrenica =

July 1992 massacre of Serbs in Bratunac and Srebrenica
- Part of Bosnian War
- Location: Bratunac and Srebrenica municipalities, Bosnia and Herzegovina
- Date: 12 July 1992
- Target: Serbs
- Deaths: 69
- Victims: Serb soldiers and civilians
- Assailant: Army of the Republic of Bosnia and Herzegovina

On 12 July 1992, a total of 69 Bosnian Serb soldiers and civilians were killed in the villages of Zalazje and Sase in the municipality of Srebrenica, and Biljača and Zagoni in the municipality of Bratunac, after an attack by the Army of the Republic of Bosnia and Herzegovina (ARBiH). It occurred during the Bosnian War.

== Background ==
At the beginning of the Bosnian war, the Army of Republika Srpska (VRS) attacked majority Bosniak cities and villages in eastern Bosnia, conducting ethnic cleansing operations with the goal of forming an adjacent Serb-controlled land bordering Serbia. After the Siege of Srebrenica, between April 1992 and March 1993, the Srebrenica area was regularly subjected to Serb military assaults, including artillery attacks, sniper fire, as well as occasional bombing from aircraft. From June 1992 to March 1993, Bosnian Muslims raided Bosnian Serb villages, partly in order to acquire food and armaments.

== Incident ==
On the Serbian Eastern Orthodox holy feast of Petrovdan on 12 July 1992, Bosniak forces, allegedly under the command of Naser Orić, attacked the villages of Zalazje and Sase in the municipality of Srebrenica and Biljača and Zagoni in the municipality of Bratunac, killing a total of 69 Bosnian Serb soldiers and civilians. At least 40 of those killed were locals from Zalazje.

Apart from the killed, there were also 22 Serbs who were reported as missing. The bodies of ten of them were found in a mass grave in June 2011 during a search for Bosniak victims above the settlement of Vidikovac. After their remains were identified, they were buried at the Zalužje cemetery.

== Aftermath ==
In 2006, Orić was sentenced to two years imprisonment by the ICTY for not preventing the mistreatment and deaths of Serb detainees. In 2008, the tribunal reversed the conviction and also acquitted him of crimes against Serbs committed in Srebrenica from 1992 to 1993. A re-trial in Bosnia and Herzegovina resulted in acquittal in 2018 on charges of killings of three Serb prisoners in the towns of Zalazje, Lolići and Kunjerac. However, the killings of Serbs in Zalazje, Sase, Biljača and Zagoni on 12 July 1992 were not part of any of the charges brought against Orić. Local officials along with the families of the victims have expressed their concerns over the lack of accountability and justice for perpetrators who committed the killings.

== Commemoration and legacy ==
Commemorations for the victims are held each year in the village of Zalazje where a memorial has been erected, alongside one for Serbian victims of the village during World War II. It is part of an annual series of public events organized by the government of Republika Srpska and veterans groups around Petrovdan, culminating in a ceremony at the military cemetery in Bratunac for Serb victims who perished in areas near Srebrenica during the war. Analysts have observed how this commemoration is held parallel to the Bosniak commemorations for the victims of the Srebrenica massacre in Potočari as a form of competing victimhood and narratives about the war.

== Sources ==
=== News ===
- Sekulić, Marinko (12 July 2019). "Zalazje: "Ko je te ljude pobio?"" [Zalazje: "Who killed those people?"]. Deutsche Welle (in Serbian).
- Živić, Petra (12 July 2018). "Srebrenica i Bratunac: Pomen za srpske žrtve ubijene na početku rata u Bosni" [Srebrenica and Bratunac: Memorial for the Serbian victims killed at the beginning of the war in Bosnia]. BBC (in Serbian).
- "Obilježena godišnjica stradanja Srba u Bratuncu i Srebrenici" [The anniversary of the suffering of Serbs in Bratunac and Srebrenica was marked]. Radio Free Europe/Radio Liberty (in Serbo-Croatian). 12 July 2021.

=== Books ===
- Mojzes, Paul (2011). Balkan Genocides: Holocaust and Ethnic Cleansing in the 20th Century. Lanham, Maryland: Rowman & Littlefield. ISBN 978-1-4422-0665-6.
- Helms, Elissa (2016). The New Bosnian Mosaic: Identities, Memories and Moral Claims in a Post-War Society. Routledge. ISBN 978-1-31702-307-4.
- Lippman, Peter (2019). Surviving the Peace: The Struggle for Postwar Recovery in Bosnia-Herzegovina. Vanderbilt University Press. ISBN 978-0-82652-263-4.

=== ICTY ===
- "Prosecutor vs. Naser Orić – Judgement" (PDF). International Criminal Tribunal for the Former Yugoslavia. 30 June 2006.
