= Siege of Srebrenica =

1992–1995 siege during the Bosnian War

- Part of the Bosnian War
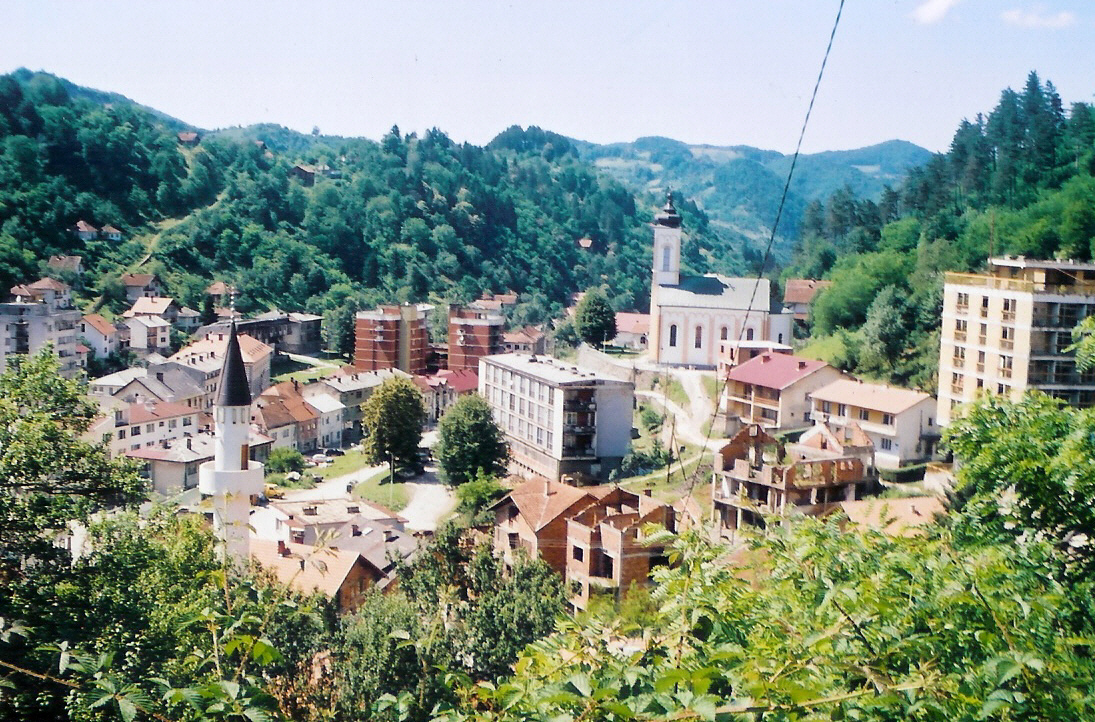
- A panorama of the town of Srebrenica
Date	9 May 1992 – 11 July 1995
Location	Srebrenica, Bosnia and Herzegovina 44°06′15″N 19°17′50″E
Result	Army of Republika Srpska victory: Srebrenica massacre begins
Territorial changes	Republika Srpska captures the Srebrenica enclave

Belligerents
Republika Srpska	Bosnia and Herzegovina; NATO (1995)

Commanders and leaders
(Republika Srpska) Ratko Mladić (Republika Srpska) Radislav Krstić (Republika Srpska) Zdravko Tolimir (Federal Republic of Yugoslavia) Željko Ražnatović	(Bosnia and Herzegovina) Naser Orić (surrendered) (Bosnia and Herzegovina) Ramiz Bećirović (WIA)

Units involved
Yugoslav People's Army (Until May 20, 1992); Army of Republika Srpska; Serb Volunteer Guard; Scorpions; Greek Volunteer Guard; Russian Volunteers	Army of the Republic of Bosnia and Herzegovina

Strength
~1,500 soldiers (before Krivaja '95); 3,000 soldiers (during Krivaja '95)	~6,000 soldiers (more than half unarmed); NATO Air Support

Casualties and losses
- Total: 9,377 war-related deaths in the Srebrenica municipality (1992–1995)

The siege of Srebrenica (Serbo-Croatian: Opsada Srebrenice, Опсада Сребреницe) was a three-year siege of the town of Srebrenica in eastern Bosnia and Herzegovina which lasted from April 1992 to July 1995 during the Bosnian War. Initially assaulted by the Yugoslav People's Army (JNA) and the Serbian Volunteer Guard (SDG), the town was encircled by the Army of Republika Srpska (VRS) in May 1992, starting a brutal siege which was to last for the majority of the Bosnian War. In June 1995, the commander of the Army of the Republic of Bosnia and Herzegovina (ARBiH) in the enclave, Naser Orić, left Srebrenica and fled to the town of Tuzla. He was subsequently replaced by his deputy, Major Ramiz Bećirović.

In July 1995, Srebrenica fell to the combined forces of the Republika Srpska and numerous paramilitary formations which included hundreds of Greek and Russian volunteers in what was codenamed Operation Krivaja '95 (Serbo-Croatian: Operacija Krivaja '95, Операција Криваја '95). The subsequent Srebrenica massacre of the town's male population led to the deaths of more than 8,000 Bosniak men and boys, and is considered the largest act of mass murder in Europe since the end of World War II. It was judged to have been a crime of genocide by international criminal courts. As a result, VRS General Radislav Krstić was found guilty by the International Criminal Tribunal for the former Yugoslavia (ICTY) of murder, persecution and aiding and abetting genocide, while VRS General Zdravko Tolimir was also convicted of genocide. Both men were sentenced to life imprisonment. One of the indictments against Ratko Mladić, the commander of the VRS during the war, is for the massacre in Srebrenica. The commander of Bosniak forces in the enclave, Naser Orić, was found guilty of failing to prevent the mistreatment of VRS prisoners held in Srebrenica between September 1992 and March 1993. His conviction was overturned in 2008.

== Background ==
Srebrenica is a small mining town in eastern Bosnia about fifteen kilometers from the Serbian border. According to a census held in 1991, 36,000 people lived in the municipality of Srebrenica, including 25,000 Bosnian Muslims (or Bosniaks) and 8,500 Serbs. This figure shows that about 75 percent of the municipal population was Bosniak and about 25 percent was Serb. The town of Srebrenica itself was inhabited by 9,000 people when Bosnia and Herzegovina declared independence from Yugoslavia in 1992. That January, a Bosnian Serb state was declared, ahead of the 29 February–1 March referendum on independence. Later renamed the Republika Srpska, it developed its own military as the JNA withdrew from Croatia and handed over its weapons, equipment and 55,000 troops to the newly created Bosnian Serb army. By 1 March, Bosnian Serb forces set up barricades in Sarajevo and elsewhere and later that month Bosnian Serb artillery began shelling the town of Bosanski Brod. By 4 April, Sarajevo was shelled. In May 1992, the ground forces of Bosnian Serb state officially became known as the Army of Republika Srpska (Serbian: Vojska Republike Srpske, VRS). By the end of 1992, the VRS held seventy percent of Bosnia and Herzegovina.

At the outbreak of the war, eastern Bosnia, a Bosniak-majority territory before the war, was subjected to ethnic cleansing operations and numerous atrocities involving murder, rape on a massive scale, plundering, and forced relocation by Serb forces and paramilitary gangs. Taking place throughout the municipalities of Srebrenica, Vlasenica, Rogatica, Bratunac, Višegrad, Zvornik and Foča, the purpose of these operations was to create in eastern Bosnia a contiguous Serb-controlled land having a common border with Serbia. Located in the heart of what Bosnian Serbs considered their territory, Srebrenica was seized by the paramilitary Serb Volunteer Guard (Serbian: Srpska dobrovoljačka garda, or SDG) on 18 April 1992. According to a witness, "organized killings of the Muslim population began" on 21 April. On 6 May, a two-day battle between Serb and Muslim forces erupted in the town. Naser Orić, a one-time member of the Serbian Ministry of Internal Affairs and former bodyguard of Serbian President Slobodan Milošević, then assumed control of Srebrenica after helping local Bosniak forces drive the SDG and other Serb paramilitary units from the town by 8 May. Goran Zekić, the leader of the Serb population in the municipality, was killed in the fighting. In June, the Muslim population of Srebrenica established a local "war council". By December 1992, they had managed to gain control of up to 95 percent of the Srebrenica municipality and half of the neighbouring Bratunac municipality. By this time, Orić's forces had established a sixty-kilometer-long Bosniak enclave which stretched from Žepa in the south to the village of Kamenica in the north, however only to be surrounded and in dire need of food by February 1993 while the population of the enclave grew to almost 40,000 as refugees from the surrounding ethnically cleansed towns and villages sought refuge in the town. Indeed, most of the enclave's residents were not originally from Srebrenica, but from all around eastern Bosnia or Podrinje.

== Siege ==
In the words of the International Criminal Tribunal for the former Yugoslavia (ICTY):

Between April 1992 and March 1993, the town of Srebrenica and the villages in the area held by Bosniaks were constantly subjected to Serb military assaults, including artillery attacks, sniper fire, as well as occasional bombing from aircraft. Each onslaught followed a similar pattern. Serb soldiers and paramilitaries surrounded a Bosniak village or hamlet, called upon the population to surrender their weapons, and then began with indiscriminate shelling and shooting. In most cases, they then entered the village or hamlet, expelled or killed the population, who offered no significant resistance, and destroyed their homes. During this period, Srebrenica was subjected to indiscriminate shelling from all directions on a daily basis. Potočari in particular was a daily target for Serb artillery and infantry because it was a sensitive point in the defence line around Srebrenica. Other Bosniak settlements were routinely attacked as well. All this resulted in a great number of refugees and casualties.

In his ICTY testimony, VRS Intelligence Chief Momir Nikolić recounted how Bosnian Serb forces were instructed to make life in Srebrenica unbearable in order to induce its civilian population to "leave en masse as soon as possible, realizing they cannot survive there." As part of this, Nikolić conceded that civilians were targeted and humanitarian aid blocked while fuel, food and other supplies for UN peacekeepers were halted so that "they could not be ready for combat".

While the Bosnian Serbs enjoyed military superiority, they were outnumbered by the Bosniaks who adopted a type of guerrilla warfare, which in the second half of 1992 and up to early 1993 was quite successful. In an attempt to press outward, Orić and his men conducted a series of raids against outlying Serb villages, or from which Bosniaks had formerly been expelled, ostensibly to seize food, weapons, ammunition and military equipment, but also to exact punishment on the local Serb population for the VRS's harassment of the enclave. During these events, Bosniak forces committed apparent violations of humanitarian law against the Bosnian Serb inhabitants, especially from May 1992 to January 1993. The most notable of these violations occurred on 7 January 1993, when Orić's men attacked the Serb village of Kravica, which bordered the Srebrenica enclave. Forty-three Serbs were killed in the attack, including 13 civilians. Orić's forces destroyed many of the villages that fell into their hands during the siege, killing perhaps 1,000 Serb soldiers and civilians: while the number of Serb soldier fatalities is unknown, the Research and Documentation Center (RDC), an organisation that compiled the most comprehensive record of deaths during the Bosnian War, established that 158 Serb civilians died in the Srebrenica municipality during the war, while a further 127 died in the Bratunac municipality. In an earlier report, it concluded that 119 Serb civilians and 424 soldiers were killed in the Bratunac municipality. Thousands of others were displaced by such attacks, which resulted in the destruction of at least 50 Serb settlements, according to the ICTY. In addition, the territory of the Federal Republic of Yugoslavia was shelled by the ARBiH.

In January 1993, ARBiH soldiers machine-gunned dozens of Serb civilians fleeing the village of Skelani. In February 1993, a Srebrenica delegation visiting Sarajevo proposed that one Sarajevan Serb be killed for every Bosniak killed in Srebrenica. At this time, the Srebrenica enclave had reached its peak size of 900 square kilometers, although it was never linked to the main area of Bosnian-held land in the west and remained "a vulnerable island amid Serb-controlled territory." In response, the VRS launched numerous operations against the town. In March 1993, General Ratko Mladić of the VRS ordered the Bosnian Serb forces besieging the town to launch a large-scale counterattack. The attack resulted in the Bosnian Serbs capturing 80 percent of the territory of the Srebrenica enclave once held by the 28th Division of the Army of the Republic of Bosnia and Herzegovina (ARBiH). However, the VRS was forced to stop its offensive after the United Nations Security Council passed Resolution 819, which called for talks between the Bosniak and Bosnian Serb military leadership and the de-militarization of Srebrenica which was declared a "safe-area". However, because of differing interpretations of the resolution, Srebrenica was never disarmed. Instead, it was surrounded by a force of approximately 2,000 men from the VRS Drina Corps, which continued its stranglehold of the enclave.

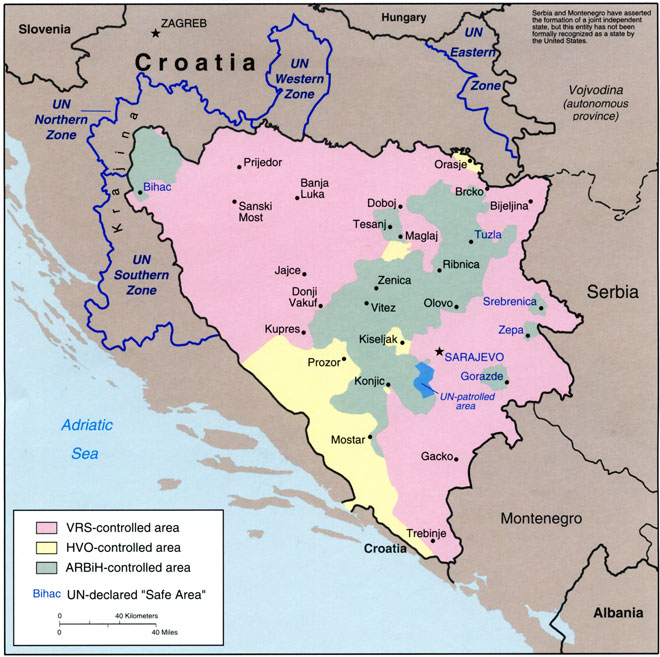
Areas of military control in Bosnia and Herzegovina in September 1994; eastern Bosnian enclaves near the Serbian border

The VRS shelled Srebrenica on 12 April 1993, killing at least 56 people and wounding 73. Within weeks, the town's population swelled from 9,000 to 40,000 as Bosniak refugees fled from the surrounding countryside. However, neither this counterattack nor the United Nations' designation of the town as a "safe area" ended Orić's raids against neighbouring Serb villages, which persisted at a rate of 3–4 per week as Bosniak forces searched for food to steal from the surrounding countryside. As a result, the VRS warned the UN peacekeeping units in Srebrenica that Bosnian Serb forces would retaliate against the town's civilian population if Bosniak forces continued attacking Serb villages. The situation in Srebrenica subsequently worsened, with the refugees and townspeople running out of food and water. Despite this, the VRS only occasionally permitted humanitarian aid to the besieged town. In one instance, the VRS permitted the evacuation of about 5,000 Bosniak women and children from Srebrenica. During these evacuations, six children were crushed to death while clambering to board a bus destined for Tuzla. Afterwards, the VRS made an offer that would allow the UN to send in any number of trucks and buses into the enclave to evacuate its Bosniak population. However, this offer was rejected by many in the United Nations, the United States and the Bosnian government, who claimed that arranging an evacuation would "assist the process of ethnic cleansing."

In 1994, the Canadian peacekeeping battalion (CANBAT) in Srebrenica was replaced by a battalion of Dutch peacekeepers (Dutchbat). With the VRS outnumbered and overextended countrywide in the winter of 1994, Mladić reasoned that it would be necessary to consolidate Bosnian Serb forces by eliminating one or more of the UN "safe areas" and the ARBiH garrisons located within them. Although attacking them would violate UN resolutions, Mladić believed that international forces would not confront the VRS as long as UNPROFOR units were vulnerable to suffering heavy casualties and hostage takings. A subsequent hostage crisis in which UN personnel were seized and used as human shields to prevent NATO airstrikes destroyed the credibility of UN deterrence in Bihać and Sarajevo. Mladić then turned his attention to Srebrenica, Goražde and Žepa, whose seizure would release considerable VRS forces for redeployment against an expected Croatian Army–ARBiH offensive in western Bosnia, while strengthening the Bosnian Serb claim to the entire Drina valley in case of a future peace settlement. Due their location, Srebrenica and Žepa were the most vulnerable of the UN "safe areas" in Bosnia, in stark contrast to Goražde, where UN forces had resisted the VRS before being enforced by the ARBiH.

Bosniak raids from the town intensified in the beginning of 1995, with Orić's forces being ordered by the ARBiH to "reconnoiter, disrupt, divert and demoralize" VRS soldiers, who subsequently retaliated with counterattacks of their own. In March 1995, Radovan Karadžić, President of Republika Srpska, issued Directive 7, setting out the long-term strategy for VRS forces surrounding Srebrenica and Žepa. The aim of the VRS was to be to "complete the physical separation of Srebrenica from Žepa as soon as possible, preventing even communication between individuals in the two enclaves. By planned and well thought out combat operations, create an unbearable situation of total insecurity with no hope of further survival or life for the inhabitants of Srebrenica." During this time, Orić ordered the murder of many political opponents and profited from smuggling supplies on the black market. At night, his men would break out from the enclave and participate in illicit trade with Bosnian Serb villagers and would also often loot the Serb countryside.

In the last two weeks of June, a VRS unit was ambushed twenty kilometers northwest of the Srebrenica enclave. By this time Orić had already been transferred to the Bosniak-held town of Tuzla, ostensibly to participate in a "command training" exercise. He was replaced by his deputy, Major Ramiz Bećirović, who had been seriously injured in a helicopter crash two months earlier and was barely able to walk. Orić's departure effectively left Srebrenica without effective leadership. Despite this, ARBiH headquarters ordered another attack against Bosnian Serb units on the Sarajevo–Zvornik road for the evening of 25–26 June. With a force of 150 men, Bosniak forces inflicted forty casualties VRS casualties and seized weapons, radios and livestock. Mladić then contacted the UN headquarters in Sarajevo and indicated that he would no longer tolerate Bosniak incursions into the Bosnian Serb countryside. Bosnian Serb forces retaliated by shelling Srebrenica, prompting the Bosniaks to respond that the VRS was again shelling a UN safe area.

In contrast to Srebrenica, the peacekeeping unit in Žepa managed to safely evacuate over 10,000 civilians, who were spared the fate of those in Srebrenica.

== Fall of Srebrenica ==
=== Operation Krivaja '95 ===
Operation Krivaja '95 Oпeрaциja Криваја '95
- Part of the Bosnian War
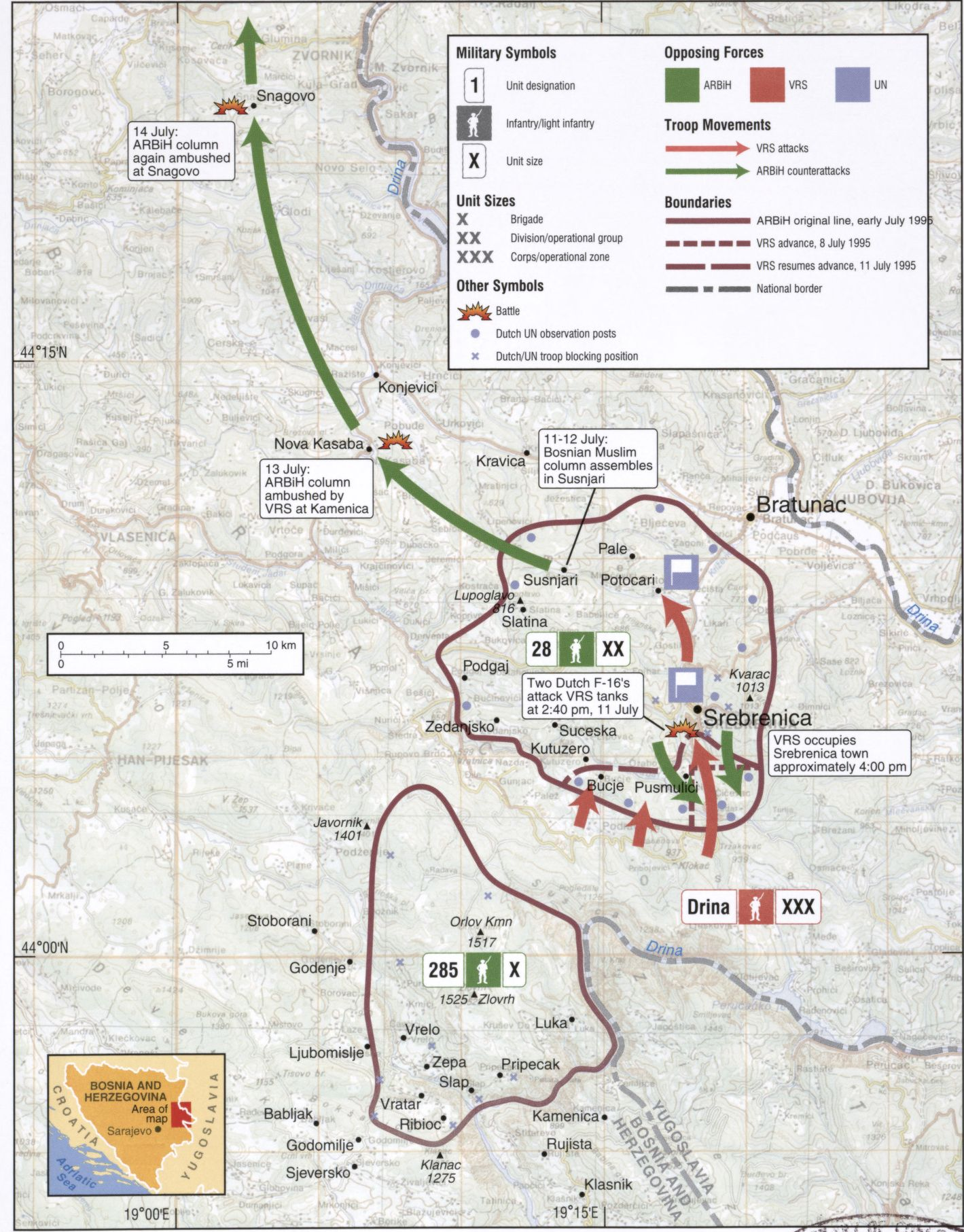
- A map depicting the capture of Srebrenica by Bosnian Serb forces
Date	6–11 July 1995
Location	Srebrenica, Bosnia and Herzegovina
Result	Army of Republika Srpska victory

Belligerents
Army of Republika Srpska; Serb Volunteer Guard; Scorpions paramilitary unit (Federal Republic of Yugoslavia) Police, volunteers and paramilitaries from Yugoslavia (Greece) Greek volunteers (Russia) Russian volunteers (Ukraine) Ukrainian volunteers	Army of the Republic of Bosnia and Herzegovina (ARBiH)	(United Nations) UNPROFOR: (Netherlands) Dutchbat; (Ukraine) Ukrainian peacekeepers

Commanders and leaders
(Republika Srpska) Ratko Mladić (Republika Srpska) Radislav Krstić (Republika Srpska) Zdravko Tolimir (Republika Srpska) Milenko Živanović (Republika Srpska) Milorad Pelemiš	(Bosnia and Herzegovina) Ramiz Bećirović	(United Nations) (Netherlands) Thomas Karremans

Strength
(Republika Srpska) 1,500–2,000 soldiers 200–300 volunteers (Greece) 100 volunteers	(Bosnia and Herzegovina) 6,000 soldiers	(United Nations) 270 peacekeepers

Casualties and losses
Unknown	More than 8,000 civilians dead and 35,632 evacuated	1 peacekeeper killed, hundreds taken hostage

Operation Krivaja '95 (Serbian: Oпeрaциja Криваја '95, Bosnian: Operacija Krivaja '95) was the codename of a military operation launched by the VRS against formations of the ARBIH in the UN enclave of Srebrenica. Launched on 6 July 1995, the operation ended the three-year-long siege of the town and was followed by the Srebrenica massacre, which has been ruled a crime of genocide by international courts of law.

In late-June 1995, Ratko Mladić made the decision to launch an attack on Srebrenica, which evidence indicates was always part of his long-term strategy. However, the Serbs did not expect Srebrenica to be an easy conquest. With 100 members of the Greek Volunteer Guard, together with 2,000–3,000 reinforcements and 200–300 members of the Serb Volunteer Guard, the Bosnian Serbs could hardly muster 4,000–5,000 men for the offensives against Srebrenica and Žepa. Of these, it was estimated that only 2,000 would take part in the thrust to capture Srebrenica in July 1995. The Bosniaks, not as well-armed as their opponents, had a military force of 6,000 men within the town, about one-third or one-half of whom were armed. 1,500 of these were professional soldiers and 1,500 were armed militiamen. Also in the town were the 570 lightly armed peacekeepers of the Dutch battalion (Dutchbat).

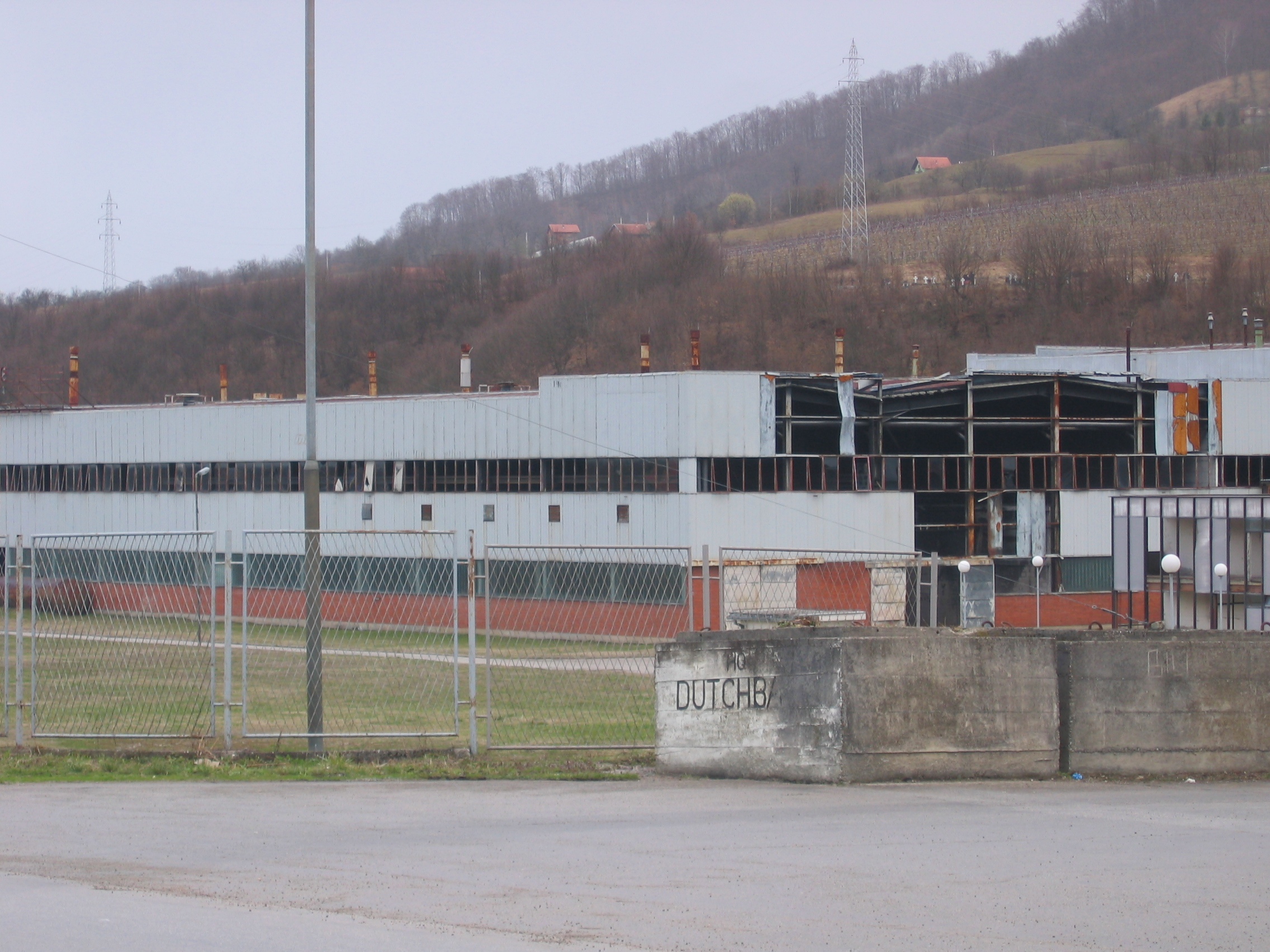
The compound that served as the headquarters of the Dutch Battalion in Potočari.

On 2 July, Major General Milenko Živanović, then commander of the Drina Corps of the VRS, signed two orders laying out the plans for an attack on the UN protected area at Srebrenica codenamed Krivaja '95. The objective of the operation was for the VRS to attack the enclave, and effectively eliminate it. Alongside police and paramilitary units from both the Republika Srpska and FR Yugoslavia, as well as Greek and Russian volunteers, the VRS began attacking various points at the southern edge of the Srebrenica enclave on 6 July. The forces of the VRS, numbering 1,500 in the initial stages of the attack, then shelled a series of Dutch observation posts in the southern portion of the enclave, forcing the Dutch peacekeepers stationed there to flee. On the other hand, the few thousand remaining Bosniak soldiers of Srebrenica offered little resistance as their best-trained units had already abandoned the town. To make matters worse, Dutch peacekeepers had confiscated their weapons. When the Bosniaks demanded that their weapons be returned to them, the Dutch refused. As a result, Bosniak troops attempted to block the Dutch withdrawal in the face of the Bosnian Serb onslaught and more than 100 Dutch soldiers were taken hostage by the Bosniaks in a desperate attempt to stop them from leaving. Subsequently, a Dutch peacekeeper was killed after a hand grenade was thrown at his APC by a Bosniak soldier. The Dutch then demanded that NATO bomb Serb positions around the town, but their requests were ignored. With virtually no Bosniak resistance, the VRS relentlessly pounded Srebrenica with artillery on 9 and 10 July. On 11 July, the VRS entered the town. As it did, Mladić had about thirty Dutch soldiers taken hostage. About 3,000–4,000 Bosniak civilians then fled to the UN compound in Potočari where all men between fourteen and seventy were segregated by the VRS, the great bulk of which were trucked to neighboring Serb-held Bratunac. Dutchbat personnel who attempted to follow them were seized by the VRS, together with their UN vehicles and some uniforms, weapons and other equipment. Whereas Mladić had expected the ARBiH 28th Division to regroup near Potočari, the men of this division chose instead to flee to Bosnian-held territory. On 12 July, the Serbs learned that the majority of the town's men had indeed fled the enclave, with 700–900 fleeing east to Serbia, 300–850 fleeing south to Žepa, and 10,000–15,000 fleeing north to Tuzla. Of these 10,000–15,000, approximately 6,000 were fleeing Bosniak soldiers, of whom 1,000–1,500 were armed. By the time the VRS had been redeployed, about 3,000 soldiers of the column's better-armed vanguard had successfully escaped to Tuzla. The 9,000–12,000 Bosniaks who remained were encircled by VRS units and attacked by artillery, armor and small arms fire. The relatively few who survived the experience recounted how many panic-stricken Bosniak men committed suicide, killed each other in the dark, or drowned while attempting to cross the Jadar river, but by far the greatest portion of the men surrendered, some unwittingly to VRS soldiers equipped with stolen UN vehicles, helmets and uniforms.

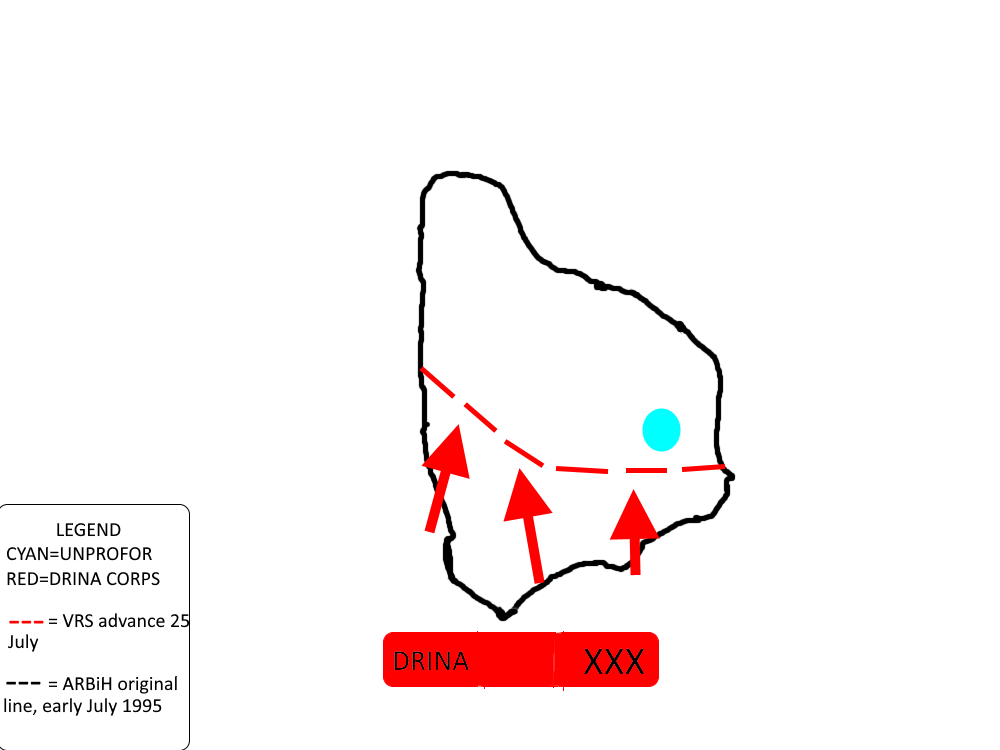
Map of Operation Stupčanica 95

At midday on 11 July, Dutch NATO planes arrived from Italy and struck a Bosnian Serb tank, before being forced to cease operations after General Mladić threatened to "destroy" both the Dutch soldiers and the Bosniak population of Srebrenica unless airstrikes were called off. That afternoon, Mladić, accompanied by General Živanović (then Commander of the Drina Corps), General Krstić (then Deputy Commander and Chief of Staff of the Drina Corps) and other Bosnian Serb officers, took a triumphant walk through the deserted streets of the town of Srebrenica. The moment was captured on film by Serbian journalist Zoran Petrović Piroćanac. Mladić posed for television cameras, before declaring that Srebrenica had been "returned forever to the Serbs." Later, Thom Karremans, the commander of the Dutch troops in the town, drank a toast with Mladić which was filmed for Serb television. Off-camera, however, Mladić warned Karremans that the UN compound in Potočari, where thousands of Bosniak refugees had gathered, would be shelled by the VRS if NATO planes reappeared.

== Aftermath ==
=== Srebrenica massacre ===
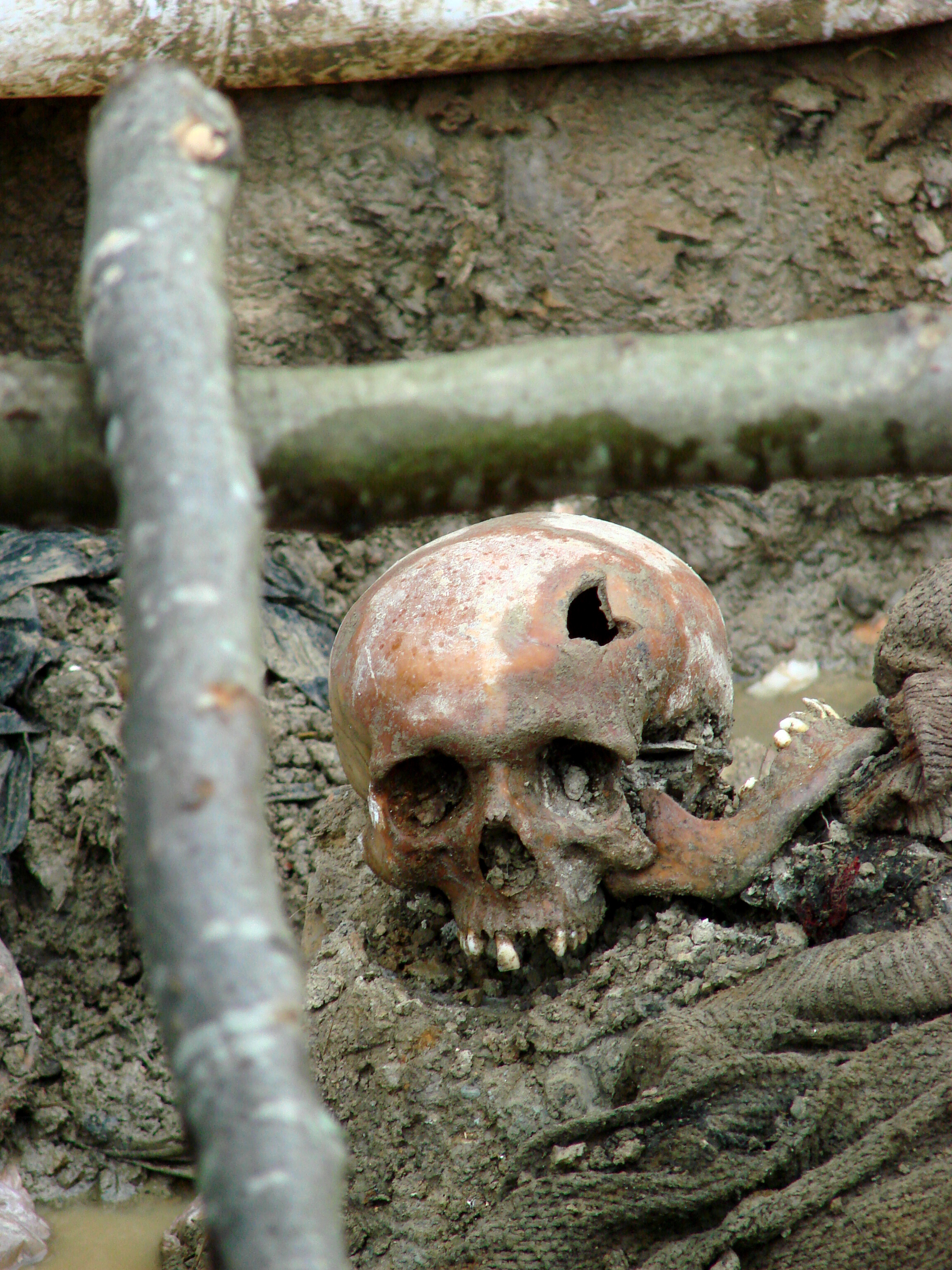
Skull of a victim of the July 1995 Srebrenica massacre. Exhumed mass grave outside the village of Potocari, Bosnia and Herzegovina. July 2007.

On 12 July, buses began arriving to take Bosniak women and children to Bosniak-held territory while Dutch troops helped Bosnian Serb forces in separating all men from the ages of 15 to 65. Some of the men were killed or beaten on the spot, while women were raped.

The fall of the town was followed by a massacre of prisoners taken by the VRS forces and civilian refugees who had been handed over to the VRS by Dutchbat troops after they had sought shelter on the Dutchbat base at Potočari. The ICTY Trial Chamber was satisfied that the total number executed was likely to have been within the range of 7,000 to 8,000. The bodies were disposed of in unmarked mass graves which were subsequently reopened and the contents mingled and relocated. The killings and their concealment, carried out in an organised and systematic manner, were subsequently confirmed by the ICTY to have been a crime of genocide pursuant to the United Nations Convention on the Prevention and Punishment of the Crime of Genocide.

For example, on 14 July 1995, prisoners from Bratunac were bussed northward to a school in the village of Pilica, north of Zvornik. As at other detention facilities, there was no food or water and several men died in the school gym from heat and dehydration. The men were held at the Pilica school for two nights. On 16 July 1995, following a now familiar pattern, the men were called out of the school and loaded onto buses with their hands tied behind their backs. They were then driven to the Branjevo Military Farm, where groups of 10 were lined up and shot systematically.

One of the survivors recalled:

When they opened fire, I threw myself on the ground ... And one man fell on my head. I think that he was killed on the spot. And I could feel the hot blood pouring over me ... I could hear one man crying for help. He was begging them to kill him. And they simply said "Let him suffer. We'll kill him later."

— Witness Q

Dražen Erdemović – who confessed to killing at least 70 Bosniaks – was a member of the VRS 10th Sabotage Detachment (a Main Staff subordinate unit) and participated in the mass execution. Erdemović appeared as a prosecution witness and testified: "The men in front of us were ordered to turn their backs. When those men turned their backs to us, we shot at them. We were given orders to shoot."

Erdemović said that all but one of the victims wore civilian clothes and that, except for one person who tried to escape, they offered no resistance before being shot. Sometimes the executioners were particularly cruel. When some of the soldiers recognised acquaintances from Srebrenica, they beat and humiliated them before killing them. Erdemović had to persuade his fellow soldiers to stop using a machine gun for the killings; while it mortally wounded the prisoners it did not cause death immediately and prolonged their suffering. Between 1,000 and 1,200 men were killed in the course of that day at this execution site. Aerial photographs, taken on 17 July 1995, of an area around the Branjevo Military Farm, show a large number of bodies lying in the field near the farm, as well as traces of the excavator that collected the bodies from the field. Erdemović testified that, at around 15:00 hours on 16 July 1995, after he and his fellow soldiers from the 10th Sabotage Detachment had finished executing the prisoners at the Branjevo Military Farm, they were told that there was a group of 500 Bosniak prisoners from Srebrenica trying to break out of a nearby Dom Kultura club. Erdemović and the other members of his unit refused to carry out any more killings. They were then told to attend a meeting with a Lieutenant Colonel at a café in Pilica. Erdemović and his fellow-soldiers travelled to the café as requested and, as they waited, they could hear shots and grenades being detonated. The sounds lasted for approximately 15–20 minutes after which a soldier from Bratunac entered the café to inform those present that "everything was over".

There were no survivors to explain exactly what had happened in the Dom Kultura. Over a year later, it was still possible to find physical evidence of this atrocity. As in Kravica, many traces of blood, hair and body tissue were found in the building, with cartridges and shells littered throughout the two storeys. It could also be established that explosives and machine guns had been used. Human remains and personal possessions were found under the stage, where blood had dripped down through the floorboards.

Čančari Road 12 was the site of the re-interment of at least 174 bodies, moved here from the mass grave at the Branjevo Military Farm. Only 43 were complete sets of remains, most of which established that death had taken place as there result of rifle fire. Of the 313 various body parts found, 145 displayed gunshot wounds of a severity likely to prove fatal.

=== Casualties ===
After the Bosnian War, the Bosnian Book of the Dead documented 9,377 violent deaths amongst citizens of Srebrenica municipality (combatants and civilians) of all ethnicities that occurred in the Srebrenica municipality from 1992 to 1995. The RDC established that at least 5,233 Bosnian-Muslim civilians were killed in Srebrenica during the war. Most estimates put the number of Bosniak men and boys killed in the July 1995 massacre at more than 8,000; the list of Bosniaks killed during this period compiled by the Bosnian Federal Commission of Missing Persons contains 8,372 names. In 2003, Serbs comprised 95 percent of the population of the Srebrenica municipality.

The Bosnian Book of the Dead, Part I, page 173-174 clarifies:

"In 1995, 9,726 persons were killed, out of which 9,022 Bosniaks, and of that number, 8,594 were killed in July 1995. According to the data we have compiled, in the period from 11 July 1995 until 31 July 1995, which can be related to the fall of the UN Safe Zone of Srebrenica and the mass killings of civilians and prisoners of war, that occurred after the fall of Srebrenica, 8,331 persons were killed in total. Of those, 5,113 were from Srebrenica, 1,766 from Bratunac, 900 from Vlasenica, 437 from Zvornik and 115 from Rogatica/Žepa. Out of these 8,372 persons, 1,416 were soldiers."

=== Indictments and trials ===
At his trial, VRS General Radislav Krstić was found by the ICTY to have been the person primarily directing Krivaja '95 from 6 July onward, at least until the arrival of Ratko Mladić on 9 July. The ICTY determined that the initial objective of Krivaja '95 had been to "reduce the United Nations-protected safe area of Srebrenica to its urban core" as a step towards "the larger VRS goal of plunging the Bosniak population into a humanitarian crisis and, ultimately, eliminating the enclave", and that after the surrounding area had fallen the VRS forces were then ordered to take the town itself. The ICTY found Krstić guilty of participating in two criminal plans, initially to ethnically cleanse the Srebrenica enclave of all Bosniak civilians and later to kill the military-aged men of Srebrenica. He was found guilty of murder, persecutions and aiding and abetting genocide.

On 31 May 2007, Zdravko Tolimir, a long-time fugitive and a former general in the VRS indicted by the Prosecutor of the ICTY on genocide charges relating to Srebrenica was arrested. On 12 December 2012, Tolimir was convicted of genocide and sentenced to life imprisonment. In May 2011, VRS General Ratko Mladić was arrested in a village in northern Serbia by three special units of the Serbian security forces. The next year, his trial began before the ICTY in The Hague on charges relating to his participation as VRS commander in the criminal conspiracy to perpetrate the Srebrenica genocide.

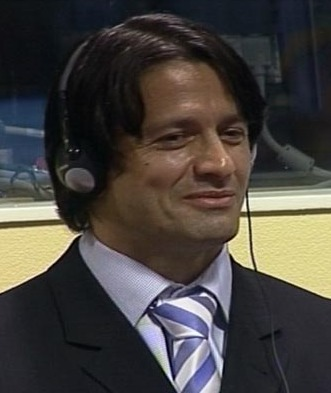
Commander Naser Orić, pictured here in 2008, led Bosniak forces in the enclave of Srebrenica from 1992 to 1995

In 2010, seven high level VRS commanders were convicted of various crimes related to the genocide in Srebrenica, including Ljubiša Beara and Vujadin Popovic, who were found guilty of Conspiracy to commit and Committing Genocide. Dragan Nikolic was found guilty of Aiding and Abetting Genocide. Former President of Serbia Slobodan Milosevic was also charged with genocide in a number of Bosnian municipalities including Srebrenica.

In 2016, Radovan Karadžić was found guilty by the ICTY for war crimes, crimes against humanity and genocide in the Srebrenica enclave, and sentenced to 40 years in prison.

Momir Nikolić, who served as Assistant Chief of Security and Intelligence for the Bratunac Brigade, Drina Corp of the VRS, pleaded guilty for crimes against humanity in front of the ICTY and was sentenced to 20 years in prison. Together with another former VRS soldier who pleaded guilty, Dražen Erdemović, he testified in front of the ICTY against Karadžić, Mladić and Beara, providing valuable information about the execution and timeline of the massacre.

Finally, on 22 November 2017, general Ratko Mladić was sentenced to a life in prison.

Bosniak commander Naser Orić was arrested by SFOR in April 2003, and handed over to the International Criminal Tribunal for the Former Yugoslavia (ICTY), who indicted him for the "murder and cruel treatment" of Bosnian Serb prisoners, as well as burning and plundering about fifty Serb villages from 1992 to 1995. In 2006, Orić was found guilty of failing to prevent the mistreatment of VRS prisoners held in Srebrenica between September 1992 and March 1993. But the former Bosniak military commander was acquitted of all other charges, including direct involvement in the killings and responsibility for the "wanton destruction" of Serb homes and property as the ICTY could not establish that Orić himself exercised sufficient control over the raids to justify convicting him of command responsibility for the atrocities. He was sentenced to two years in jail, but was freed immediately as he had already spent three years behind bars. Orić's two-year conviction was also subsequently overturned in July 2008 by the appeals chamber which ruled that "the legal requirements to prove Orić's criminal responsibility had not been met."

== See also ==
- Siege of Bihać
- Siege of Goražde
- Siege of Mostar
- Siege of Sarajevo
