= Pobrđe =

Pobrđe may refer to:

- Pobrđe (Bratunac), Bosnia and Herzegovina
- Pobrđe, Kotor, Montenegro
- Pobrđe (Novi Pazar), Serbia
- Pobrđe (Raška), Serbia
