= Svilile =

Coordinates: 44°13′N 19°07′E

Svilile Свилиле
- Village
- Location within Bosnia and Herzegovina
- Country: Bosnia and Herzegovina
- Entity: Republika Srpska
- Municipality: Bratunac
- Time zone: UTC+1 (CET)
  - Summer (DST): UTC+2 (CEST)

Svilile (Serbian Cyrillic: Свилиле) is a village in the municipality of Bratunac, Bosnia and Herzegovina. It is approximately 1.2 km northeast of Nova Kasaba.

== History ==
During the Bosnian War of the 1990s, Svilile, along with all of the Drina Valley, was ethnically cleansed of its Bosnian Muslim population by the Serb-controlled Army of Republika Srpska. The methods of ethnic cleansing included rape, torture, mass murder and forced evacuations. Between 30 June and 2 July 1998, the State Commission on Missing Persons exhumed the remains of 26 Bosnian Muslims in Svilile.
