= Opravdići =

Opravdići Оправдићи
- Village
- Location within Bosnia and Herzegovina
- Coordinates: 44°13′47″N 19°13′09″E
- Country: Bosnia and Herzegovina
- Entity: Republika Srpska
- Municipality: Bratunac
- Time zone: UTC+1 (CET)
  - Summer (DST): UTC+2 (CEST)

Opravdići (Serbian Cyrillic: Оправдићи) is a village in the municipality of Bratunac, Bosnia and Herzegovina.
