= Polom (Bratunac) =

Village in Bosnia and Herzegovina

Polom Полом
- Village
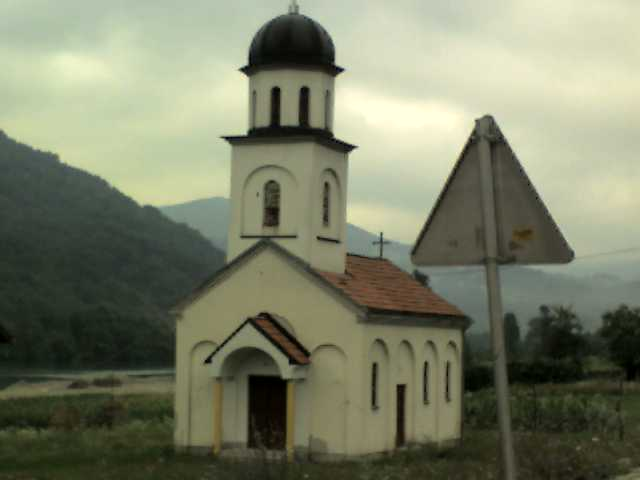

- Location within Bosnia and Herzegovina
- Coordinates: 44°15′38″N 19°14′09″E
- Country: Bosnia and Herzegovina
- Entity: Republika Srpska
- Municipality: Bratunac

Population
  - Total: 222
- (2013)
- Time zone: UTC+1 (CET)
  - Summer (DST): UTC+2 (CEST)

Polom (Serbian Cyrillic: Полом) is a village in the municipality of Bratunac, Bosnia and Herzegovina.

In Polom 1991 lived 436 inhabitants, of which 432 (99,08%) Serbs. In 2013, it had a population of 222 inhabitants.
