= Lipenovići =

Lipenovići Липеновићи
- Village
- Location within Bosnia and Herzegovina
- Coordinates: 44°10′52″N 19°10′48″E
- Country: Bosnia and Herzegovina
- Entity: Republika Srpska
- Municipality: Bratunac
- Time zone: UTC+1 (CET)
  - Summer (DST): UTC+2 (CEST)

Lipenovići (Serbian Cyrillic: Липеновићи) is a village in the municipality of Bratunac, Bosnia and Herzegovina.
