= Zapolje, Bosnia and Herzegovina =

Zapolje Запоље
- Village
- Location within Bosnia and Herzegovina
- Coordinates: 44.11°N 19.45°E
- Country: Bosnia and Herzegovina
- Entity: Republika Srpska
- Municipality: Bratunac
- Time zone: UTC+1 (CET)
  - Summer (DST): UTC+2 (CEST)

Zapolje (Serbian Cyrillic: Запоље) is a village in the municipality of Bratunac, Republika Srpska, Bosnia and Herzegovina.
