= Joševa (Bratunac) =

Coordinates: 44.1300°N 19.2711°E

Joševa Јошева
- Village
- Interactive map of Joševa
- Country: Bosnia and Herzegovina
- Entity: Republika Srpska
- Municipality: Bratunac
- Time zone: UTC+1 (CET)
  - Summer (DST): UTC+2 (CEST)

Joševa (Serbian Cyrillic: Јошева) is a village in the municipality of Bratunac, Bosnia and Herzegovina.
