= Suha (Bratunac) =

Suha Суха
- Village
- Location within Bosnia and Herzegovina
- Coordinates: 44°18′N 18°44′E
- Country: Bosnia and Herzegovina
- Entity: Republika Srpska
- Municipality: Bratunac
- Time zone: UTC+1 (CET)
  - Summer (DST): UTC+2 (CEST)

Suha (Serbian Cyrillic: Суха) is a village in the municipality of Bratunac, Bosnia and Herzegovina.
