= Hranča =

Coordinates: 44.1978°N 19.2964°E

Hranča Хранча
- Village
- Interactive map of Hranča
- Country: Bosnia and Herzegovina
- Time zone: UTC+1 (CET)
  - Summer (DST): UTC+2 (CEST)

Hranča (Serbian Cyrillic: Хранча) is a village in the Municipality of Bratunac, Bosnia and Herzegovina.

== History ==
During the Bosnian War, in May 1992, 12 Bosniak civilians were killed in the village by Bosnian Serb forces.
