= Pobuđe =

Pobuđe Побуђе
- Village
- Location within Bosnia and Herzegovina
- Coordinates: 44°13′18″N 19°07′48″E
- Country: Bosnia and Herzegovina
- Entity: Republika Srpska
- Municipality: Bratunac
- Time zone: UTC+1 (CET)
  - Summer (DST): UTC+2 (CEST)

Pobuđe (Serbian Cyrillic: Побуђе) is a village in the municipality of Bratunac, Bosnia and Herzegovina.
