= Stanatovići =

Stanatovići Стантовићи
- Village
- Location within Bosnia and Herzegovina
- Coordinates: 44°05′02″N 19°28′30″E
- Country: Bosnia and Herzegovina
- Entity: Republika Srpska
- Municipality: Bratunac
- Time zone: UTC+1 (CET)
  - Summer (DST): UTC+2 (CEST)

Stanatovići (Serbian Cyrillic: Станатовићи) is a village in the municipality of Bratunac, Bosnia and Herzegovina.
