= Vitkovići (Bratunac) =

Coordinates: 44°14′55″N 19°18′57″E

Vitkovići Витковићи
- Village
- Interactive map of Vitkovići
- Country: Bosnia and Herzegovina
- Entity: Republika Srpska
- Municipality: Bratunac
- Time zone: UTC+1 (CET)
  - Summer (DST): UTC+2 (CEST)

Vitkovići (Serbian Cyrillic: Витковићи) is a village in the municipality of Bratunac, Bosnia and Herzegovina.
