= Krke, Bratunac =

Krke Крке
- Village
- Location within Bosnia and Herzegovina
- Coordinates: 44°13′32″N 19°7′16″E
- Country: Bosnia and Herzegovina
- Entity: Republika Srpska
- Municipality: Bratunac
- Time zone: UTC+1 (CET)
  - Summer (DST): UTC+2 (CEST)

Krke (Serbian Cyrillic: Крке) is a village in the municipality of Bratunac, Bosnia and Herzegovina.

== History ==
On 18 November 2011, it was announced that an exhumation was completed under the supervision of the Prosecutor's Office of Bosnia and Herzegovina. The exhumation team found the skeletal remains of one individual, a Bosnian Muslim believed to have been killed by Serbs in 1995.
