= Pirići (Bratunac) =

Coordinates: 44°07′48″N 19°24′52″E

Pirići Пирићи
- Village
- Interactive map of Pirići
- Country: Bosnia and Herzegovina
- Entity: Republika Srpska
- Municipality: Bratunac
- Time zone: UTC+1 (CET)
  - Summer (DST): UTC+2 (CEST)

Pirići (Serbian Cyrillic: Пирићи) is a village in the municipality of Bratunac, Bosnia and Herzegovina.
