= Urkovići =

Coordinates: 44°13′30″N 19°09′40″E

Urkovići Урковићи
- Village
- Interactive map of Urkovići
- Country: Bosnia and Herzegovina
- Entity: Republika Srpska
- Municipality: Bratunac
- Time zone: UTC+1 (CET)
  - Summer (DST): UTC+2 (CEST)

Urkovići (Serbian Cyrillic: Урковићи) is a village in the municipality of Bratunac, Bosnia and Herzegovina.
