= Jagodnja (Bratunac) =

Jagodnja Јагодња
- Village
- Location within Bosnia and Herzegovina
- Coordinates: 44°03′03″N 19°30′06″E
- Country: Bosnia and Herzegovina
- Entity: Republika Srpska
- Municipality: Bratunac
- Time zone: UTC+1 (CET)
  - Summer (DST): UTC+2 (CEST)

Jagodnja (Serbian Cyrillic: Јагодња) is a village in the municipality of Bratunac, Bosnia and Herzegovina.

In 1991, Jagodnja had an overwhelmingly Muslim population; 284 (99.30%) of its 286 inhabitants were Muslim. In 2013, the village had a population of 60 inhabitants.
