= Abdulići =

Abdulići Абдулићи
- Village
- Location within Republika Srpska Location within Bosnia and Herzegovina
- Coordinates: 44°04′24″N 19°32′18″E
- Country: Bosnia and Herzegovina
- Entity: Republika Srpska
- Municipality: Bratunac

Population (1991)
  - Total: 327
- Time zone: UTC+1 (CET)
  - Summer (DST): UTC+2 (CEST)

Abdulići (Serbian Cyrillic: Абдулићи) is a village in the municipality of Bratunac, Bosnia and Herzegovina. It lies near the bank of the Drina River. According to the 1991 census it had a population of 327 people, 99.39% of whom were Muslims.
