= Momir Nikolić =

Serbian war criminal

Momir Nikolić (born 20 February 1955) is an ethnic Serb who served as Assistant Chief of Security and Intelligence for the Bratunac Brigade, Drina Corps, Serb Army, VRS, at a time when the unit was engaged in legal and illegal operations in and around Srebrenica. In 2003, he pleaded guilty to crimes against humanity, for which he received a 20-year sentence.

== Background ==
Nikolić is a native of Hrancin, Bratunac, he served as Assistant Chief of Security and Intelligence for the Bratunac Brigade, Drina Corps, Bosnian Serb Army, VRS. On 26 March 2002 he was indicted, charged with persecutions on political, racial and religious grounds (crimes against humanity).

Nikolić was arrested by SFOR on 1 April 2002 and transferred to International Criminal Tribunal for the former Yugoslavia (ICTY) custody the following day. Nikolić made his initial appearance on 3 April 2002, pleading not guilty on all counts. A plea agreement was reached on 7 May 2003 and Nikolić pleaded guilty to Count 5 of the indictment - Crimes against humanity.

A written Factual Basis for the crime and for Nikolić's participation in it was filed with the plea agreement. The Factual Basis and the indictment, which Nikolić acknowledged to be true, set out the following acts:

- the murder of over 7,000 Bosnian Muslim men ages 16–60, including some women, children, and elderly men;
- the cruel and inhumane treatment of Bosnian Muslim civilians, including beatings in and around Potocari and in detention facilities in Bratunac;
- the terrorising of Bosnian Muslim civilians in Srebrenica and Potocari on 12–13 July 1995;
- the destruction of personal property and effects belonging to the Bosnian Muslims; and
- the forcible transfer of the entire Bosnian Muslim population from the Srebrenica enclave.

Nikolić was sentenced to 27 years' imprisonment on 2 December 2003. The sentence was reduced to 20 years by the ICTY Appeals Chamber on 8 March 2006.

Nikolić was transferred to Finland to serve his sentence on 11 April 2007. Credit was given for time served since 2 April 2002, and he was granted early release on 14 March 2014, effective 1 July 2014.
