= Krasanovići =

Krasanovići Красановићи
- Village
- Location within Bosnia and Herzegovina
- Coordinates: 44°14′N 19°20′E
- Country: Bosnia and Herzegovina
- Entity: Republika Srpska
- Municipality: Bratunac
- Time zone: UTC+1 (CET)
  - Summer (DST): UTC+2 (CEST)

Krasanovići (Serbian Cyrillic: Красановићи) is a village in the municipality of Bratunac, Bosnia and Herzegovina.
