= Kravica =

Kravica Кравица
- Village
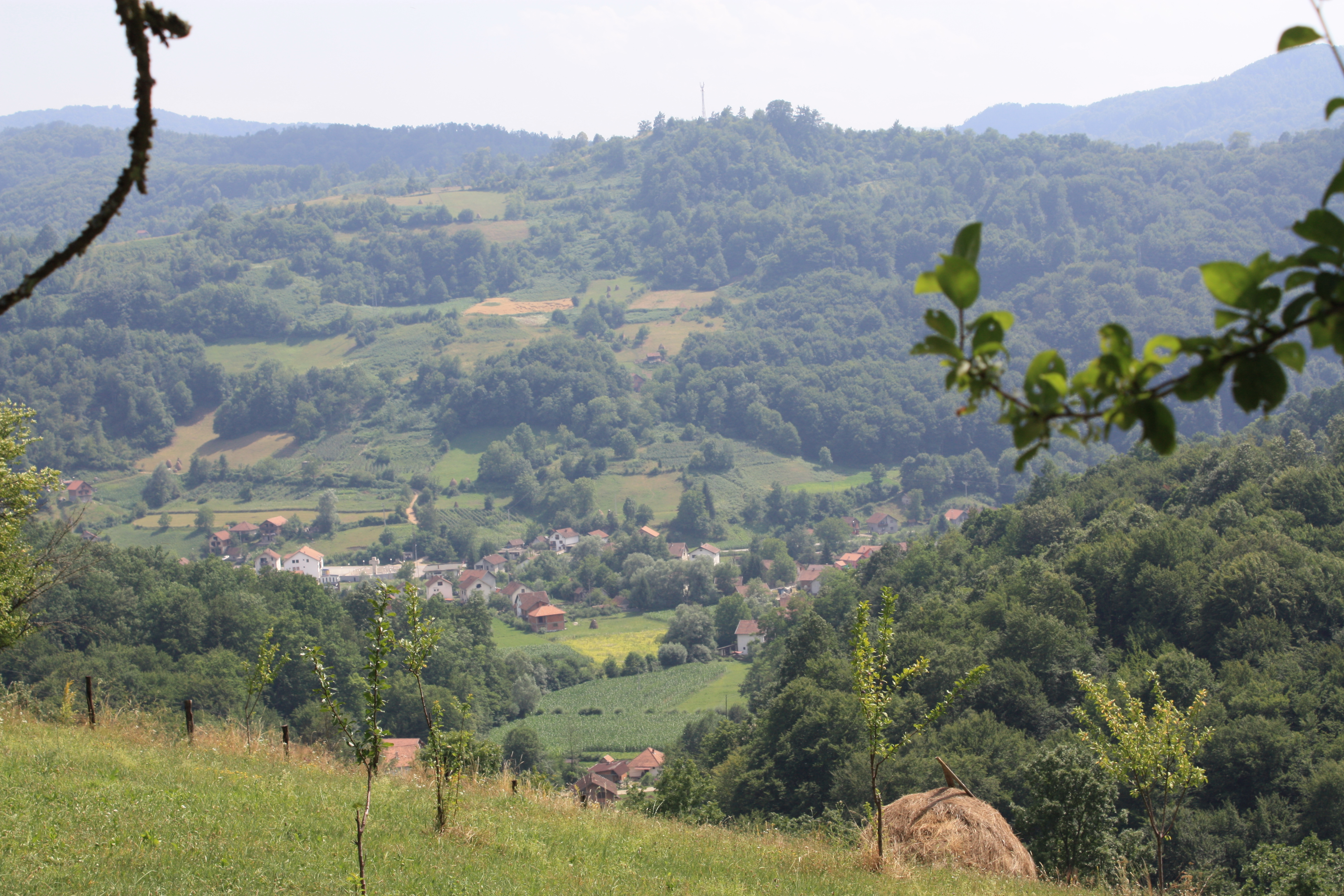

- Location within Bosnia and Herzegovina
- Coordinates: 44°13′N 19°12′E
- Country: Bosnia and Herzegovina
- Entity: Republika Srpska
- Municipality: Bratunac

Area
  - Total: 2.43 km^{2} (0.94 sq mi)

Population (2013)
  - Total: 567
  - Density: 233/km^{2} (604/sq mi)

Kravica (Serbian Cyrillic: Кравица) is a village in Bratunac, Republika Srpska, Bosnia and Herzegovina. As of 2013 census, it has a population of 567 inhabitants.

During the 1992–95 Bosnian War, the village was badly damaged in the 1993 attack.

== History ==
In 1971 there was a shootout between men from Kravica and men from Konjević Polje.

In 1991, it was reported that the neighbouring Serb-inhabited Kravica and Bosniak-inhabited Glogova "had bad blood".

=== Bosnian War ===
The village was attacked on 7 January (Serb Orthodox Christmas) 1993 by the ARBiH forces under Naser Orić from the besieged Srebrenica enclave under the control of the ARBiH. 46 people died in the attack on the Serb side: 35 VRS soldiers and 11 civilians, and most of the houses were damaged. Men from Kravica participated in the Srebrenica genocide committed against Bosniak civilians and prisoners of war.

== Demographics ==
In 1991, it had a population of 357, of whom 353 were declared as Serbs, with no declared Bosniaks, Croats or Yugoslavs. As of the 2013 census, it has a population of 567 inhabitants 16 of whom are Bosniaks.
