= Sikirić =

Sikirić Сикирић
- Village
- Location within Bosnia and Herzegovina
- Coordinates: 44°07′48″N 19°26′13″E
- Country: Bosnia and Herzegovina
- Entity: Republika Srpska
- Municipality: Bratunac
- Time zone: UTC+1 (CET)
  - Summer (DST): UTC+2 (CEST)

Sikirić (Serbian Cyrillic: Сикирић) is a village in the municipality of Bratunac, Bosnia and Herzegovina.
