= Pobrđe (Bratunac) =

Pobrđe Побрђе
- Village
- Location within Republika Srpska Location within Bosnia and Herzegovina
- Coordinates: 44°09′56″N 19°21′18″E
- Country: Bosnia and Herzegovina
- Entity: Republika Srpska
- Municipality: Bratunac
- Time zone: UTC+1 (CET)
  - Summer (DST): UTC+2 (CEST)

Pobrđe (Serbian Cyrillic: Побрђе) is a village in the municipality of Bratunac, Republika Srpska, Bosnia and Herzegovina.
