= Bjelovac =

Bjelovac Бјеловац
- Village
- Location within Bosnia and Herzegovina
- Coordinates: 44°09′36″N 19°24′30″E
- Country: Bosnia and Herzegovina
- Entity: Republika Srpska
- Municipality: Bratunac
- Time zone: UTC+1 (CET)
  - Summer (DST): UTC+2 (CEST)

Bjelovac (Serbian Cyrillic: Бјеловац) is a village in the municipality of Bratunac, Bosnia and Herzegovina.

== History ==
Forces of the Army of the Republic of Bosnia and Herzegovina killed 109 Serbs in the village in December 1992, during the Bosnian War. Among the victims were 54 women and 12 children.
