= Pobrđe, Kotor =

Pobrđe Побрђе
- Village
- Location within Montenegro
- Coordinates: 42.349873°N 18.745665°E
- Country: Montenegro
- Region: Coastal
- Municipality: Kotor

Population (2011)
  - Total: 110
- Time zone: UTC+1 (CET)
  - Summer (DST): UTC+2 (CEST)

Pobrđe (Montenegrin: Побрђе) is a village in the municipality of Kotor, Montenegro.

== Demographics ==
According to the 2011 census, its population was 110.

Ethnicity in 2011
Ethnicity	Number	Percentage
Serbs	77	70.0%
Montenegrins	19	17.3%
other/undeclared	14	12.7%
Total	110	100%
