= Fakovići =

Fakovići Факовићи
- Village
- Location within Bosnia and Herzegovina
- Coordinates: 44°05′N 19°31′E
- Country: Bosnia and Herzegovina
- Entity: Republika Srpska
- Municipality: Bratunac
- Time zone: UTC+1 (CET)
  - Summer (DST): UTC+2 (CEST)

Fakovići (Serbian Cyrillic: Факовићи) is a village in the municipality of Bratunac, Bosnia and Herzegovina.
