= Donji Potočari =

Donji Potočari Доњи Поточари
- Village
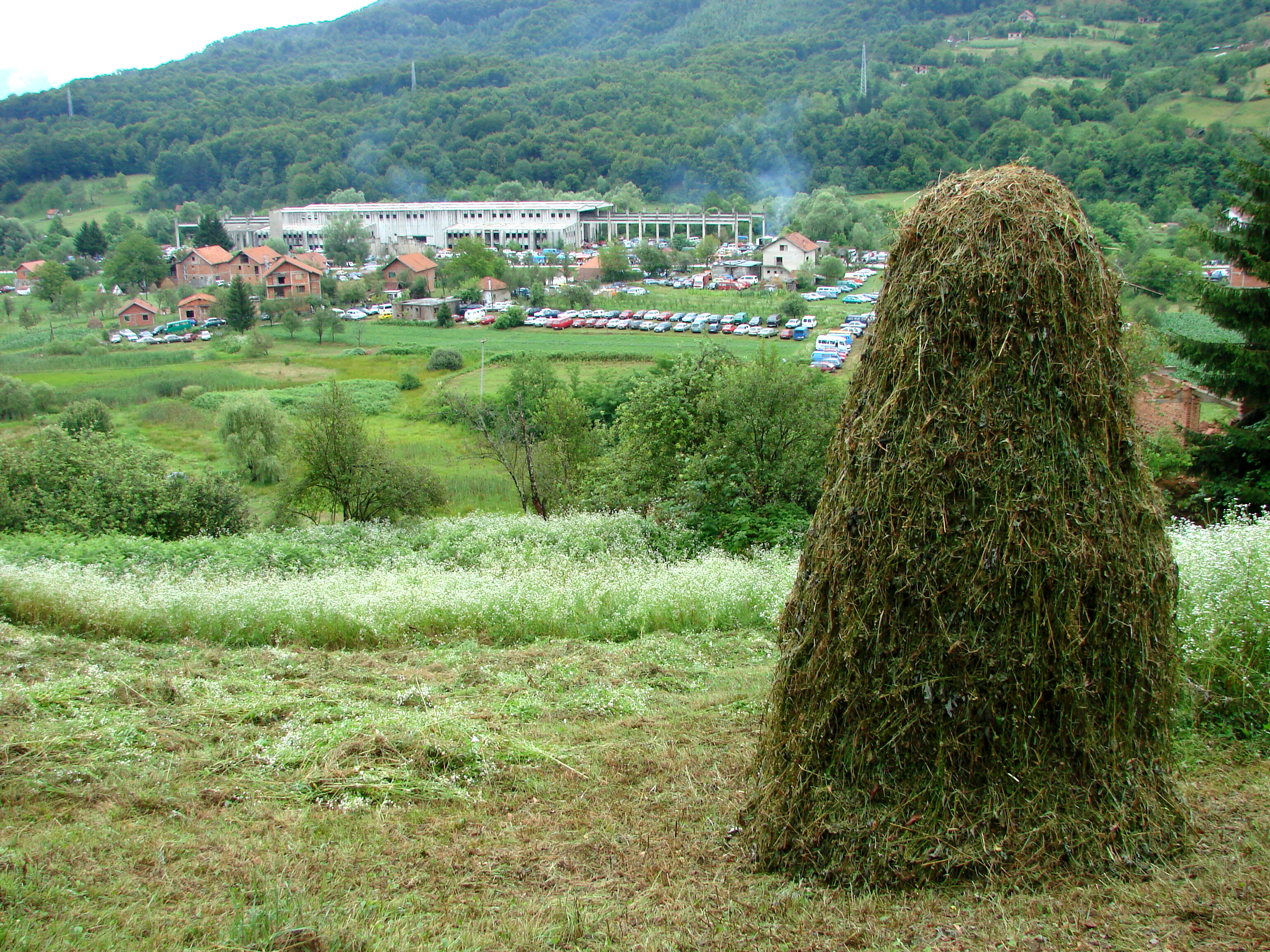
- Countryside around Potočari

- Location within Bosnia and Herzegovina
- Coordinates: 44°08′56.00″N 19°17′52.00″E
- Country: Bosnia and Herzegovina
- Entity: Republika Srpska
- Municipality: Srebrenica

Area
  - Total: 4.36 km^{2} (1.68 sq mi)
- Elevation: 240 m (790 ft)

Population (2013)
  - Total: 705
  - Density: 162/km^{2} (419/sq mi)
- Time zone: UTC+1 (CET)
  - Summer (DST): UTC+2 (CEST)

Donji Potočari (Serbian Cyrillic: Доњи Поточари) is a village located in the municipality of Srebrenica, Republika Srpska, Bosnia and Herzegovina. As of 2013 census, the village has a population of 705 inhabitants.

== History ==
=== Bosnian War ===
During the Bosnian War, the village was in the Srebrenica municipality. Along with all other places in the municipality, its population swelled as it hosted refugees from neighboring parts of Bosnia. When Serb forces overran the municipality in July 1995, they carried out the Srebrenica massacre, killing over 8,000 Bosniak (Muslim) men and boys.

=== Postwar ===
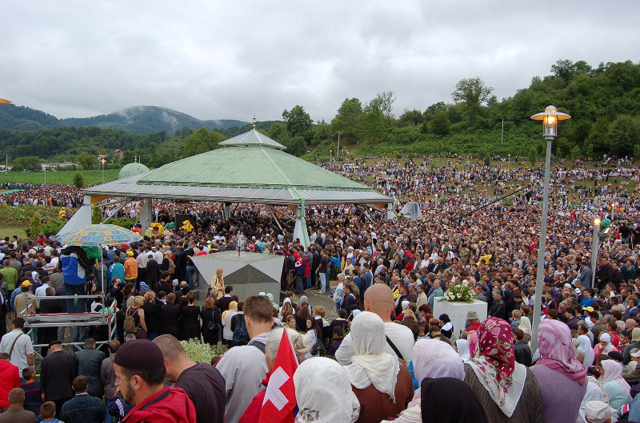
Annual commemoration of the Srebrenica genocide, 11 July 2007

In October 2000, Wolfgang Petritsch, the High Representative for Bosnia and Herzegovina, declared that the land in Potočari would be turned into a memorial and cemetery for the victims of the genocide. In May 2001, a foundation was established to oversee and finance construction of the Srebrenica Genocide Memorial. Two months later, around the time of the sixth anniversary of the massacre, a foundation stone was laid for the memorial in front of a crowd of 15,000 people. The first memorial was held in July 2002, with about 20,000 attendees. The first 600 victims were buried in the new cemetery in March 2003.

The main memorial and the cemetery are here. The biggest donation for the funding of the memorial and cemetery was made by the US government, and the memorial was dedicated by former president Bill Clinton in 2003; during the 10th anniversary commemoration another 619 of the victims were buried. Today there are more than 5,000 people buried here. As more of the 8,200 massacre victims are exhumed from mass graves and identified, it is likely they will be interred here.

== Demographics ==
As of 1991 census, it had a population of 1,147 inhabitants, of whom 981 (85.5%) were Bosniaks, 147 (12.7%) Serbs and 19 others. As of 2013 census, the village has a population of 705 inhabitants, of whom 363 (51.5%) were Bosniaks, 330 (46.8%) Serbs and 12 others.

== Notable residents ==
- Naser Orić, Bosnian army commander during the Bosnian War
