= Kravica attack (1993) =

1993 battle of the Bosnian War

- Part of the Bosnian War
- Kravica (Bosnia and Herzegovina)
- Location: 44°13′N 19°12′E; Kravica, Bosnia and Herzegovina
- Date: 7 January 1993
- Target: Bosnian Serb civilians and soldiers
- Attack type: attack
- Deaths: 41–48 (30–35 soldiers, 11–13 civilians)
- Victims: VRS troops and ethnic Serb civilians
- Perpetrator: Army of the Republic of Bosnia and Herzegovina (ARBIH)

The Kravica attack was an attack on the Bosnian Serb village of Kravica by the Army of the Republic of Bosnia and Herzegovina (ARBiH) from the Srebrenica enclave on Orthodox Christmas Day, 7 January 1993. The attack was organized to coincide with the Serbian Orthodox Christmas, leaving the Serbs unprepared for any attack. 41-48 people died in the attack on the Serb side: 30-35 soldiers and 11-13 civilians.

The event is still marked by controversy. Republika Srpska claimed that all the homes were systematically torched by Bosniak armed group, but this could not be independently verified during the trial of Naser Orić by the ICTY. Orić was acquitted of the charges relating to the killings, and later acquitted of all charges on appeal.

During the massacre of Serbs in Kravica, one of the members of Naser Orić's unit named Rizo, who participated in the massacre of Serbs, wrote a song about it called "Ko na Božić u Kravicu dođe" ("Who comes to Kravica on Christmas"), in which he insulted the Serbian victims.

== Prelude ==
In April 1992 in an effort to link up Serb-held territories in Bosnia-Herzegovina; eastern Bosnia, including the towns of Srebrenica and Bratunac, came under attack by Serbian and Bosnian Serb forces. The Serbs managed to seize Bratunac on 17 April and Srebrenica itself on 18 April 1992, which was followed by large scale massacres in early May. However, in early May 1992 a loose band of Bosniak forces under the command of Naser Orić - the local police commander - was able to drive Bosnian Serb forces out of Srebrenica and establish the town as a Bosnian government controlled enclave surrounded by Serb-held territory.

Srebrenica however remained besieged and in a state of near-starvation and Bosniak villages and towns around Srebrenica were under constant attack by Serb forces, which led the town to be flooded with refugees. The Bosnian Institute in the UK has published a list of 296 villages destroyed by Serb forces around Srebrenica three years before the genocide and in the first three months of war (April - June 1992):

More than three years before the 1995 Srebrenica genocide, Bosnian Serb nationalists - with the logistical, moral and financial support of Serbia and the Yugoslav People's Army (JNA) - destroyed 296 predominantly Bosniak (Bosnian Muslim) villages in the region around Srebrenica, forcibly uprooting some 70,000 Bosniaks from their homes and systematically massacring at least 3,166 Bosniaks (documented deaths) including many women, children and the elderly.

According to the Naser Orić trial judgement:

Between April 1992 and March 1993, Srebrenica town and the villages in the area held by Bosnian Muslims were constantly subjected to Serb military assaults, including artillery attacks, sniper fire, as well as occasional bombing from aircraft. Each onslaught followed a similar pattern. Serb soldiers and paramilitaries surrounded a Bosnian Muslim village or hamlet, called upon the population to surrender their weapons, and then began with indiscriminate shelling and shooting. In most cases, they then entered the village or hamlet, expelled or killed the population, who offered no significant resistance, and destroyed their homes. During this period, Srebrenica was subjected to indiscriminate shelling from all directions on a daily basis. Potočari in particular was a daily target for Serb artillery and infantry because it was a sensitive point in the defence line around Srebrenica. Other Bosnian Muslim settlements were routinely attacked as well. All this resulted in a great number of refugees and casualties.

== The attack ==
On 7 and 8 January 1993, Bosnian government soldiers attacked the Serb-inhabited village of Kravica. The Troops were from a number of villages within the Srebrenica enclave. At the time of the attack, there were a number of village guards and some Serb civilians in Kravica. Evidence shows that there was also Serb military presence in the area. The attack was met with resistance. Serbs fired artillery at the attacking Bosniaks from houses and other buildings; houses in the area were torched. Property was destroyed on a large scale. However, the evidence is unclear as to the number of houses that were wantonly destroyed by Bosniaks, as opposed to other causes.

Insight into the original documentation of the Army of the Republika Srpska (VRS) showed that military victims highly outnumbered the civilian ones. The document entitled "Warpath of the Bratunac Brigade", puts the military victims at 35 killed; the number of civilian victims of the attack is eleven. Other sources place the victims at 43 killed, among them at least 13 civilians.

== Aftermath ==
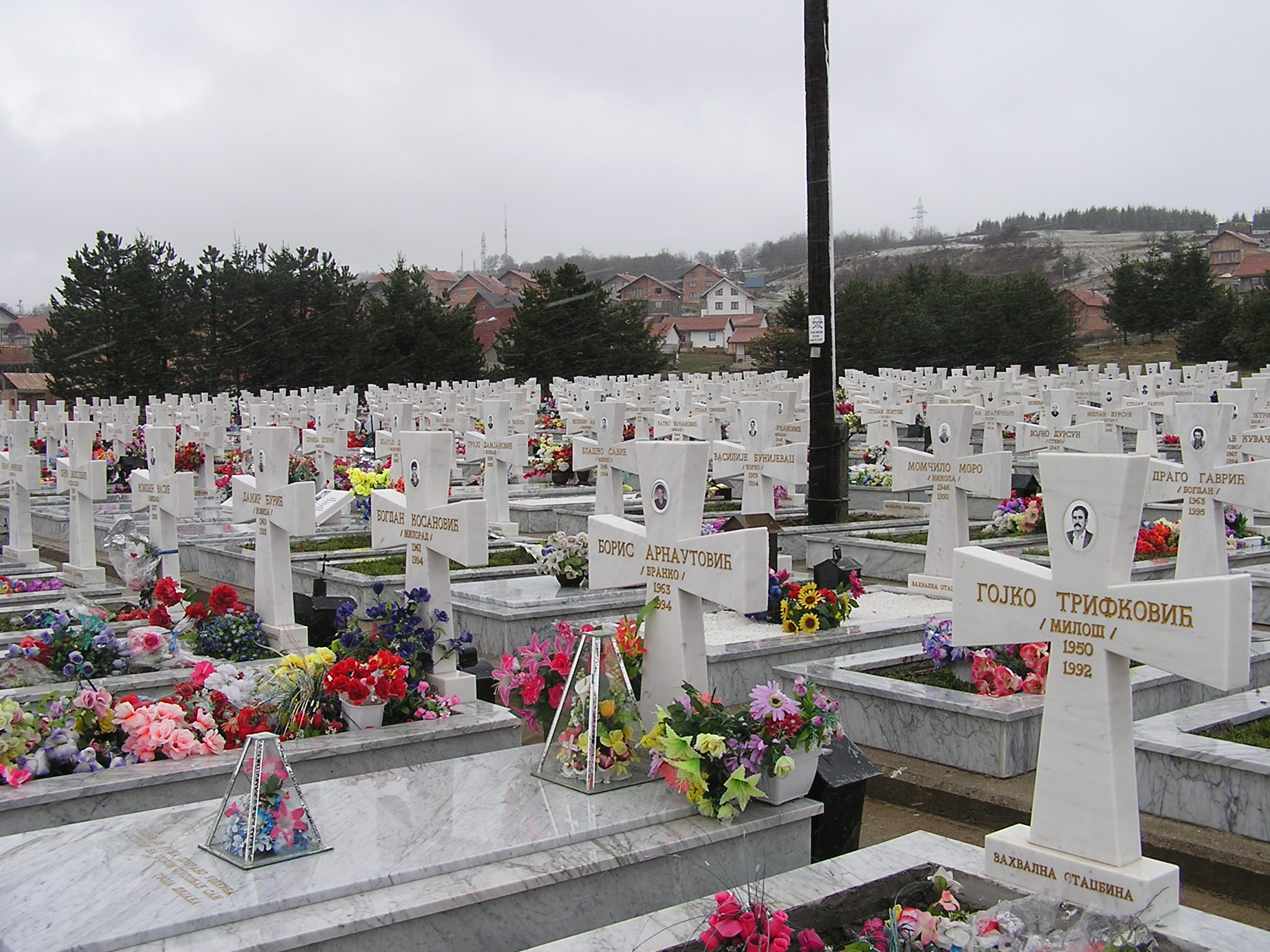
A Serbian cemetery of the civil victims of the war.

Soon after the attack on Kravica, Serb forces launched a major offensive resulting in United Nations declaring Srebrenica a "safe area" where significant number of Bosnian government forces were hiding under command of Naser Orić.

The controversy over the nature and number of the casualties came to a head in 2005, the 10th anniversary of the massacre. According to Human Rights Watch, the ultra-nationalist Serbian Radical Party "launched an aggressive campaign to prove that Bosniaks had committed crimes against thousands of Serbs in the area" which "was intended to diminish the significance of the July 1995 crime."

In 2006, Orić appeared before the Trial Chamber of the International Criminal Tribunal for the former Yugoslavia (ICTY) in the Netherlands charged with a number of offences, including (in respect of Kravica) wanton destruction, and causing damage to civilian infrastructure, beyond the realm of military necessity. He was acquitted of this and a number of other charges in 2006 and acquitted of all charges by the Appeals Court in 2008.

Some Serbs, including Republika Srpska former president Milorad Dodik, cite the Kravica attack as justification for the Srebrenica massacre.

== Legal findings ==
The Judgment in the case against Orić indicates that Kravica was a military base from which Serbs launched deadly attacks on neighbouring Bosnian Muslim villages and town of Srebrenica itself. The Bosniak counter-attack on Kravica on 7 January 1993 followed as a result of Serb blockade of humanitarian aid and constant attacks on nearby Bosnian Muslim villages. It was a response to earlier Serb attacks that occurred in December 1992.

The fighting intensified in December 1992 and the beginning of January 1993, when Bosnian Muslims were attacked by Bosnian Serbs primarily from the direction of Kravica and Ježestica. In the early morning of 7 January 1993, Orthodox Christmas day, Bosnian Muslims attacked Kravica, Ježestica and Šiljkovići. Convincing evidence suggests that the village guards were backed by the VRS [Bosnian Serb Army], and following the fighting in the summer of 1992, they received military support, including weapons and training. A considerable amount of weapons and ammunition was kept in Kravica and Šiljkovići. Moreover, there is evidence that besides the village guards, there was Serb and Bosnian Serb military presence in the area... The Trial Chamber is not satisfied that it can be attributed solely to Bosnian Muslims. The evidence is unclear as to the number of houses destroyed by Bosnian Muslims as opposed to those destroyed by Bosnian Serbs. In light of this uncertainty, the Trial Chamber concludes that the destruction of property in Kravica between 7 and 8 December 1992 does not fulfil the elements of wanton destruction of cities, towns or villages not justified by military necessity.

The Judgment also confirms that Bosniak refugees in the besieged enclave started dying from starvation caused by the Serb blockade of humanitarian aid. As a result, Bosniaks had to counter-attack Serb military bases around Srebrenica to obtain much needed food and other necessities for the survival:

Between June 1992 and March 1993, Bosniaks raided a number of villages and hamlets inhabited by Bosnian Serbs, or from which Bosnian Muslims had formerly been expelled. One of the purposes of these actions was to acquire food, weapons, ammunition and military equipment. According to the Bosnian Serbs, these actions resulted in considerable loss to Bosnian Serb life and property ... Bosnian Serb forces controlling the access roads were not allowing international humanitarian aid – most importantly, food and medicine – to reach Srebrenica. As a consequence, there was a constant and serious shortage of food causing starvation to peak in the winter of 1992/1993. Numerous people died or were in an extremely emaciated state due to malnutrition.
