= Konjevići =

Konjevići Коњевићи
- Village
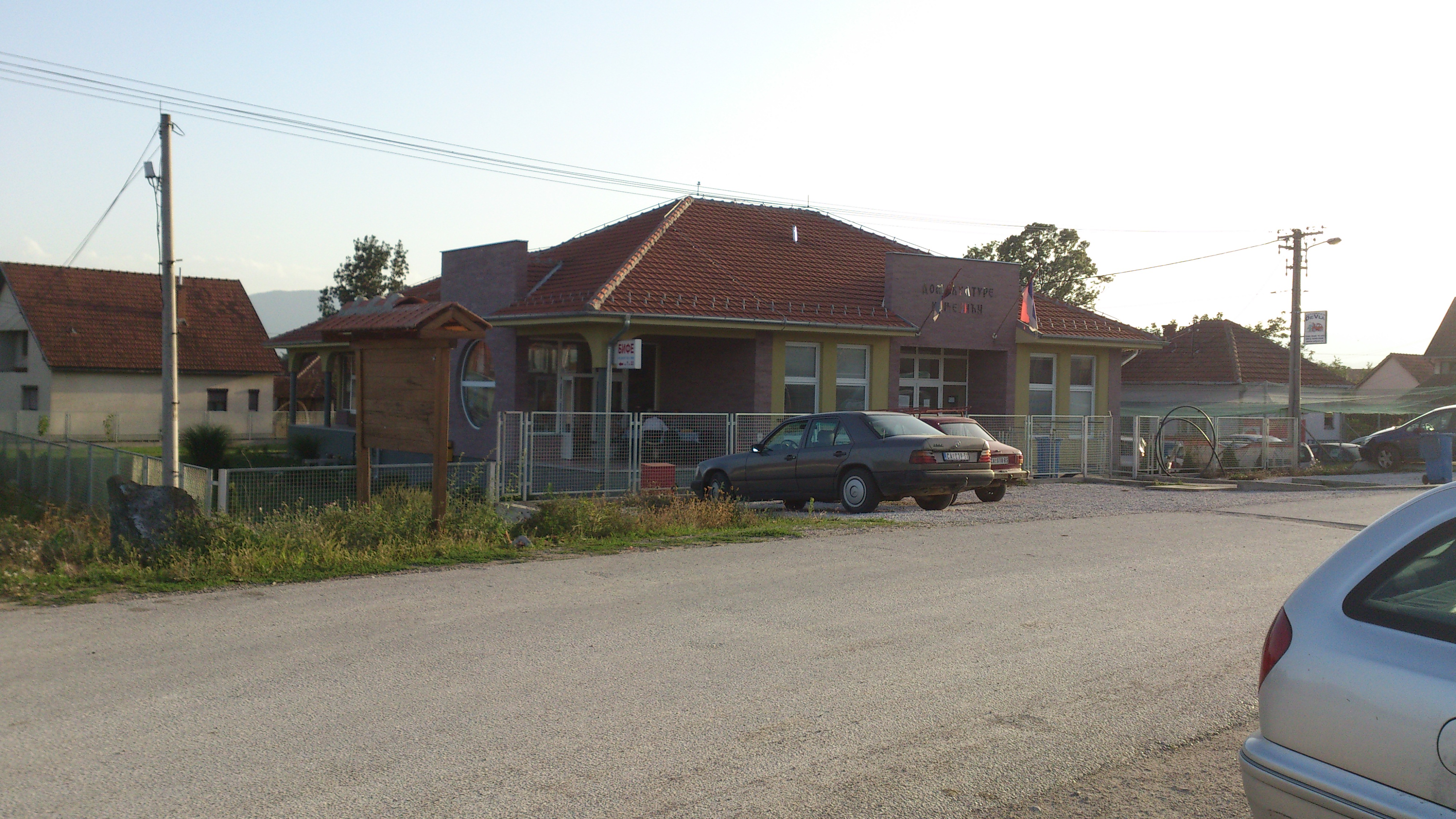
- House of Culture in Konjevići

- Location within Serbia
- Coordinates: 43.9006°N 20.3972°E
- Country: Serbia
- District: Moravica
- Municipality: Čačak

Area
  - Total: 4.59 km^{2} (1.77 sq mi)
- Elevation: 218 m (715 ft)

Population (2011)
  - Total: 859
  - Density: 187/km^{2} (485/sq mi)
- Time zone: UTC+1 (CET)
  - Summer (DST): UTC+2 (CEST)

Konjevići (Serbian: Коњевићи) is a village located in the municipality of Čačak, Serbia. According to the 2011 census, the village has a population of 859 people.
