= Zalužje (Bratunac) =

Coordinates: 44°09′52″N 19°23′33″E

Zalužje Залужје
- Village
- Interactive map of Zalužje
- Country: Bosnia and Herzegovina
- Entity: Republika Srpska
- Municipality: Bratunac
- Time zone: UTC+1 (CET)
  - Summer (DST): UTC+2 (CEST)

Zalužje (Serbian Cyrillic: Залужје) is a village in the municipality of Bratunac, Bosnia and Herzegovina.
