= Zagoni (Bratunac) =

Zagoni Загони
- Village
- Location within Bosnia and Herzegovina
- Coordinates: 44°10′36″N 19°17′15″E
- Country: Bosnia and Herzegovina
- Entity: Republika Srpska
- Municipality: Bratunac
- Time zone: UTC+1 (CET)
  - Summer (DST): UTC+2 (CEST)

Zagoni (Serbian Cyrillic: Загони) is a village in the municipality of Bratunac, Republika Srpska, Bosnia and Herzegovina.

== Bosnian War ==
In Zagoni 1991 lived 588 inhabitants, of which 483 (82,14%) Serbs. In 1992 the village was allegedly attacked twice by the Bosnian army. The first time on 5 July 1992 and the second time 12 July 1992. In the first attack Bosnians were accused of killing 14 and the second 7 Serbs.
