= Sase, Srebrenica =

Sase Сасе
- Village
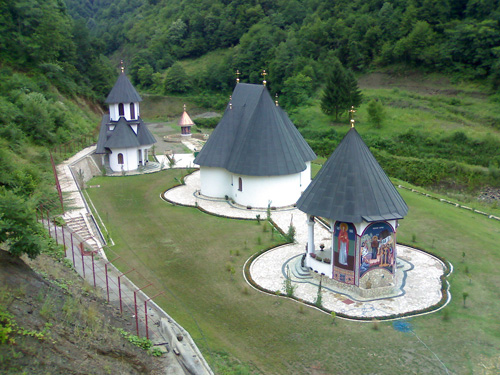

- Location within Bosnia and Herzegovina
- Coordinates: 44°07′24″N 19°22′05″E
- Country: Bosnia and Herzegovina
- Municipality: Srebrenica
- Time zone: UTC+1 (CET)
  - Summer (DST): UTC+2 (CEST)

Sase (Serbian Cyrillic: Сасе) is a village in the municipality of Srebrenica, Bosnia and Herzegovina.

== See also ==
- Sase Monastery
