= Bratunac =

Bratunac Братунац
- Town and municipality
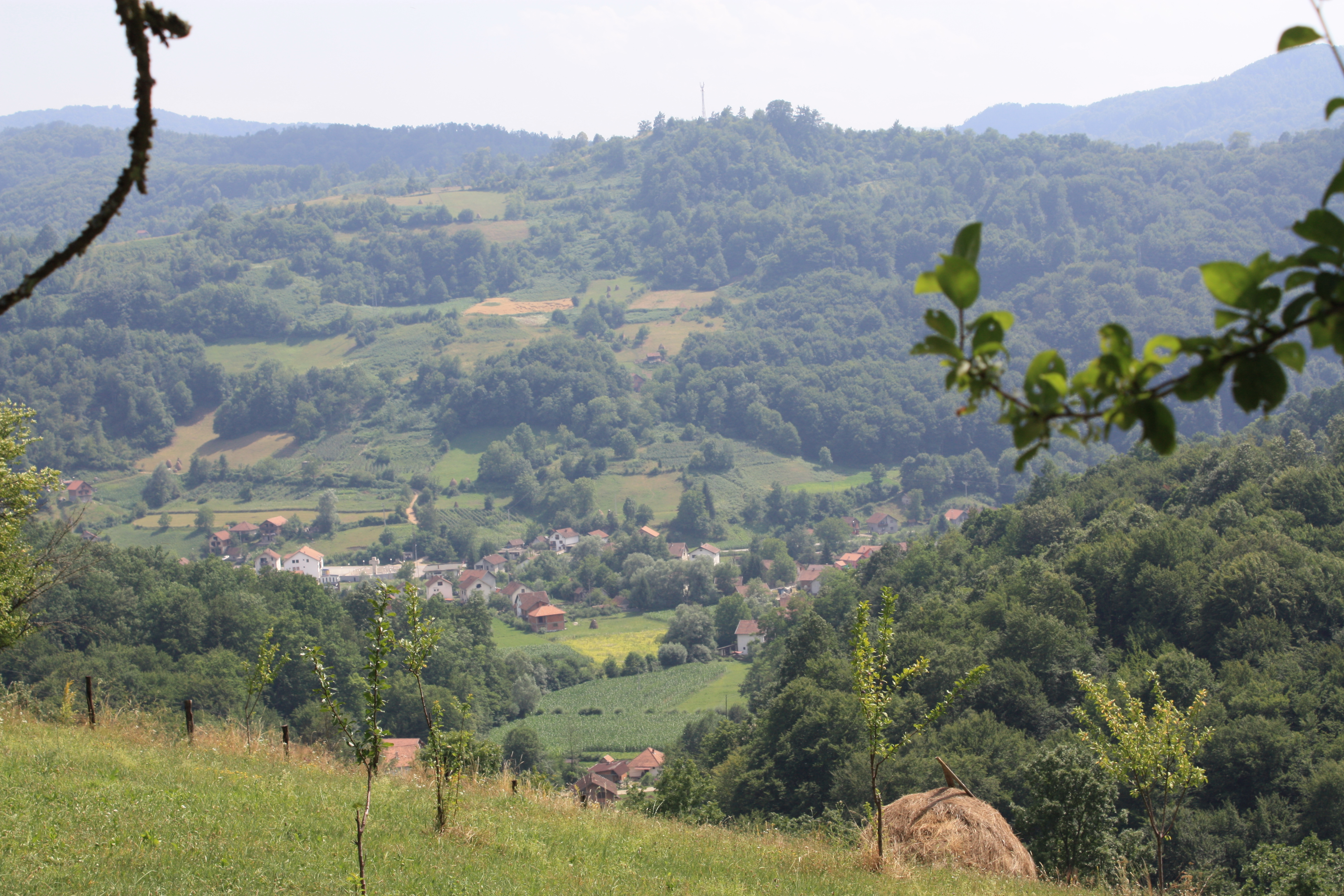
- Bratunac

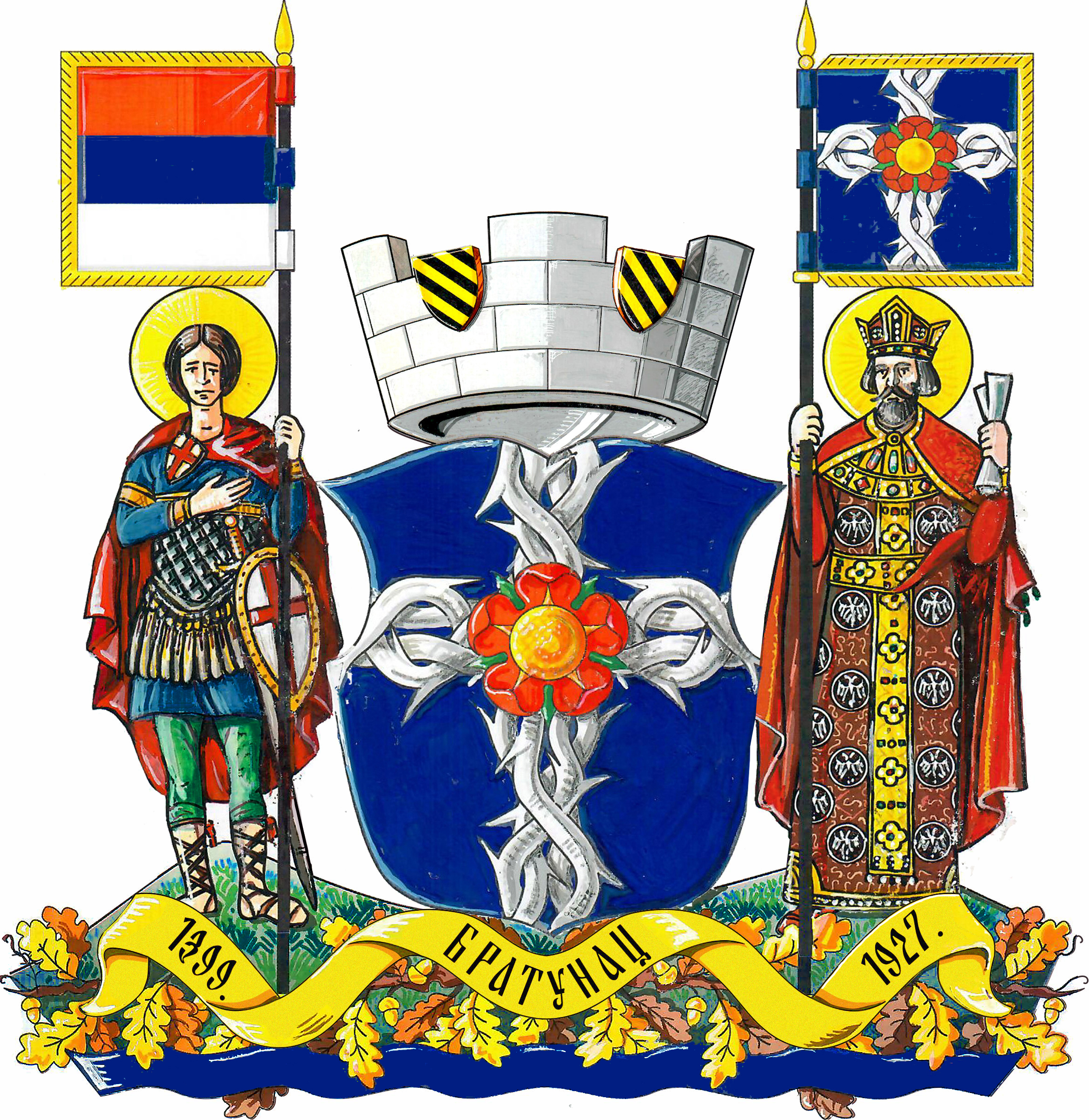
- Coat of arms

- Location of Bratunac within Bosnia and Herzegovina

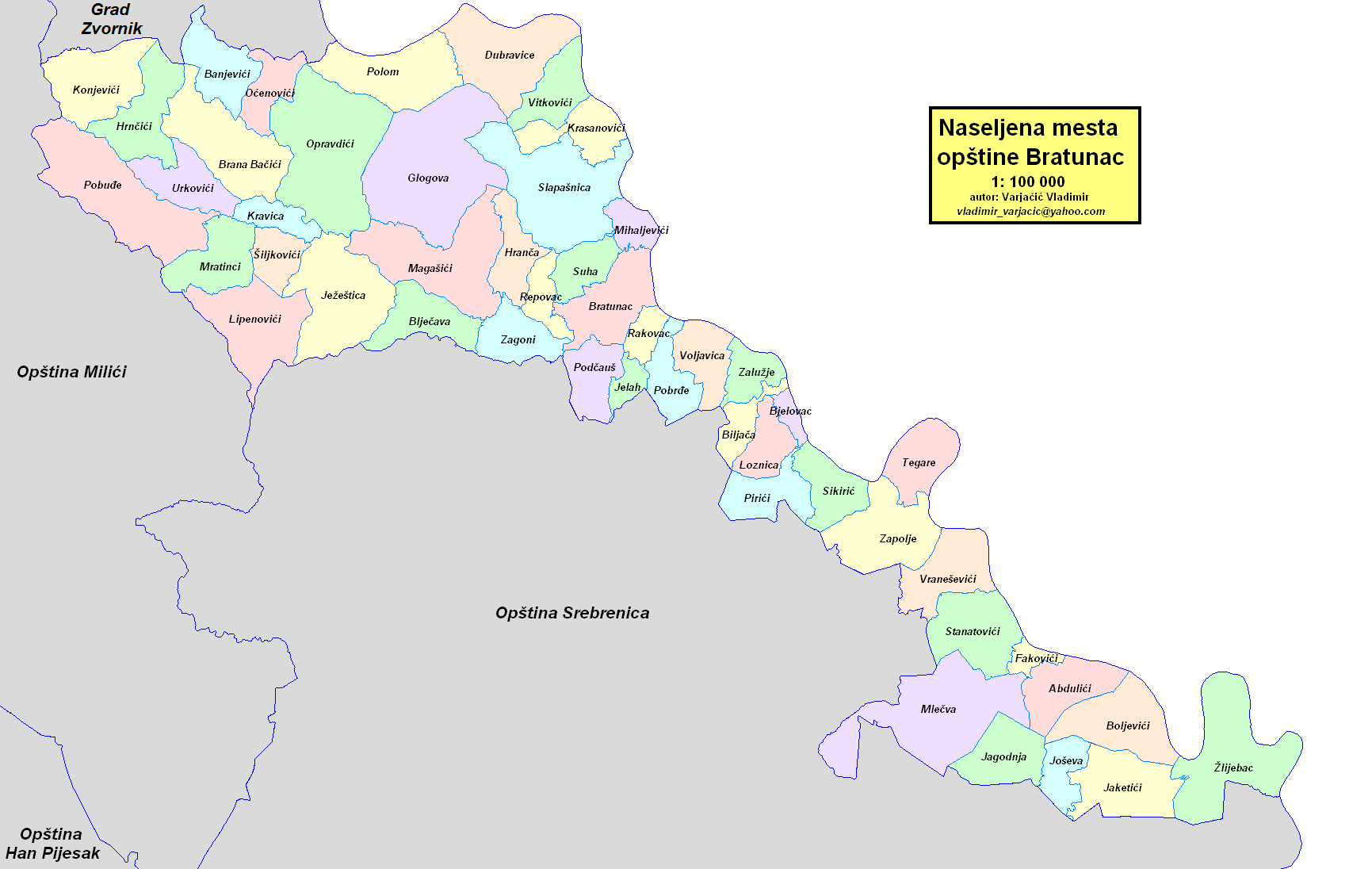
- Coordinates: 44°11′02″N 19°19′51″E
- Country: Bosnia and Herzegovina
- Entity: Republika Srpska
- Geographical region: Podrinje

Government
  - Municipal mayor: Lazar Prodanović (SNSD)
  - Municipality: 293.49 km^{2} (113.32 sq mi)

Population (2013 census)
  - Town: 8,359
  - Municipality: 20,340
  - Municipality density: 69.30/km^{2} (179.5/sq mi)
- Time zone: UTC+1 (CET)
  - Summer (DST): UTC+2 (CEST)
- Area code: 56
- Website: opstinabratunac.com

Bratunac (Serbian Cyrillic: Братунац) is a town and municipality in Republika Srpska, Bosnia and Herzegovina. As of 2013 census, the municipality has a population of 20,340 inhabitants, while the town of Bratunac has a population of 8,359 inhabitants.

== History ==
=== Early history ===
In 1381, the name Bratunac was mentioned for the first time because of the direct road from Bosnia and Herzegovina to Serbia that passed through Bratunac. At the time, Bratunac was composed of five houses and had a population of roughly 30 people.

In 1461, the region was conquered by the Ottomans under Mehmed II. Under Ottoman rule, it was transformed into a kasbah that included mosques, a madrasa, several mekteps, shadirvans, caravanserais, and other types of Islamic architecture. In 1878, as the Ottoman Empire fell into decline, Austro-Hungary annexed Bosnia and Herzegovina and ruled over Bratunac until its dissolution at the end of the WW1.

In 1927, Bratunac became a municipality for the first time.

== Settlements ==
Aside from the town of Bratunac, the municipality consists of the following settlements:

- Abdulići
- Banjevići
- Biljača
- Bjelovac
- Blječeva
- Boljevići
- Brana Bačići
- Dubravice
- Fakovići
- Glogova
- Hranča
- Hrnčići
- Jagodnja
- Jaketići
- Jelah
- Ježeštica
- Joševa
- Konjevići
- Krasanovići
- Kravica
- Krke
- Lipenovići
- Loznica
- Magašići
- Mihaljevići
- Moštanice
- Mlečva
- Mratinci
- Oćenovići
- Opravdići
- Osamsko
- Pirići
- Pobrđe
- Pobuđe
- Podčauš
- Polom
- Rakovac
- Repovac
- Sikirić
- Slapašnica
- Stanatovići
- Suha
- Šiljkovići
- Svilile
- Tegare
- Urkovići
- Vitkovići
- Voljavica
- Vraneševići
- Zagoni
- Zalužje
- Zapolje
- Žlijebac

== Demographics ==
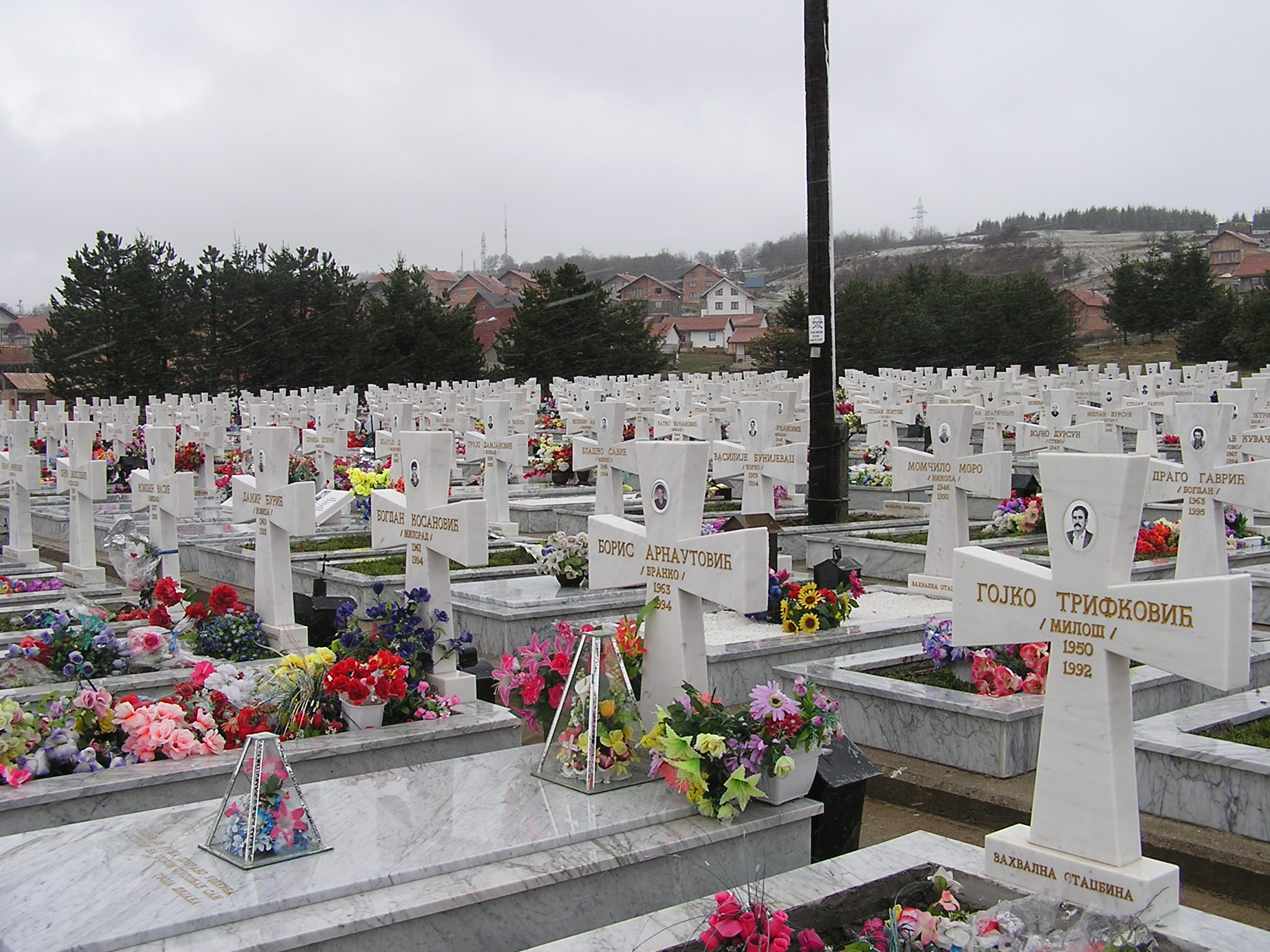
Serbian Orthodox cemetery in Bratunac.

According to the Columbia-Lippincott Gazetteer, in 1948 Bratunac had a population of 5,033.

=== Population ===
Population of settlements – Bratunac municipality
	Settlement	1948.	1953.	1961.	1971.	1981.	1991.	2013.
	Total	5,234	9,647	23,149	26,513	30,333	33,375	20,340
1	Biljača						655	211
2	Bjelovac						290	201
3	Bratunac			1,410	2,716	5,515	7,695	8,359
4	Dubravice						388	269
5	Glogova						1,913	848
6	Hranča						701	317
7	Hrnčići						1,226	646
8	Ježeštica						503	342
9	Konjevići						998	615
10	Krasanovići						532	284
11	Kravica						363	558
12	Magašići						646	486
13	Mihaljevići						391	224
14	Opravdići						441	247
15	Pobuđe						2,359	993
16	Polom						436	206
17	Rakovac						537	423
18	Repovac						504	351
19	Slapašnica						542	286
20	Suha						988	371
21	Urkovići						1,095	460
22	Voljavica						1,379	273
23	Zagoni						588	305
24	Žlijebac						380	240

=== Ethnic composition ===
Ethnic composition – Bratunac town
	2013.	1991.	1981.	1971.
Total	8,359 (100,0%)	7,695 (100,0%)	5,515 (100,0%)	2,716 (100,0%)
Muslims/Bosniaks		4,311 (56,02%)	2,715 (49,23%)	1,210 (44,55%)
Serbs		3 037 (39,47%)	2,308 (41,85%)	1,406 (51,77%)
Yugoslavs		159 (2,066%)	312 (5,657%)	1 (0,037%)
Others		156 (2,027%)	26 (0,471%)	32 (1,178%)
Croats		32 (0,416%)	31 (0,562%)	32 (1,178%)
Roma			87 (1,578%)	9 (0,331%)
Albanians			18 (0,326%)	11 (0,405%)
Montenegrins			15 (0,272%)	12 (0,442%)
Macedonians			3 (0,054%)	2 (0,074%)
Hungarians				1 (0,037%)

Ethnic composition – Bratunac municipality
	2013.	1991.	1981.	1971.
Total	20,340 (100,0%)	33,619 (100,0%)	33,033 (100,0%)	26,513 (100,0%)
Serbs	12,350 (60,72%)	11,475 (34,13%)	12,055 (36,49%)	12,820 (48,35%)
Muslims/Bosniaks	7,803 (38,36%)	21,535 (64,06%)	17,349 (52,52%)	13,428 (50,65%)
Others	154 (0,757%)	346 (1,029%)	2,766 (8,373%)	118 (0,445%)
Croats	33 (0,162%)	40 (0,119%)	41 (0,124%)	50 (0,189%)
Yugoslavs		223 (0,663%)	645 (1,953%)	15 (0,057%)
Roma			124 (0,375%)	26 (0,098%)
Montenegrins			31 (0,094%)	36 (0,136%)
Albanians			18 (0,054%)	16 (0,060%)
Macedonians			4 (0,012%)	3 (0,011%)
Hungarians				1 (0,004%)

Data by settlements

Ethnic structure of the population of Bratunac municipality, by settlements, 2013 census
Settlement	total	Muslims/Bosniaks	Croats	Serbs	others
Biljača	306	301	0	5	0
Bjelovac	207	2	0	205	0
Bratunac	7,827	730	27	6,997	73
Dubravice	270	0	0	270	0
Glogova	920	914	0	6	0
Hranča	368	259	0	99	0
Hrnčići	780	780	0	0	0
Ježeštica	345	0	0	345	0
Konjevići	735	735	0	0	0
Krasanovići	287	156	0	130	1
Kravica	567	0	0	567	0
Magašići	527	236	2	289	0
Mihaljevići	233	231	0	2	0
Opravdići	275	23	0	252	0
Pobuđe	1,286	1,286	0	0	0
Polom	217	0	0	216	1
Rakovac	433	36	0	388	9
Repovac	352	13	3	336	0
Slapašnica	304	37	0	266	1
Suha	396	202	1	193	0
Urkovići	504	504	0	0	0
Voljavica	419	417	0	2	0
Zagoni	316	18	0	298	0
Žlijebac	272	0	0	272	0

== Economy ==
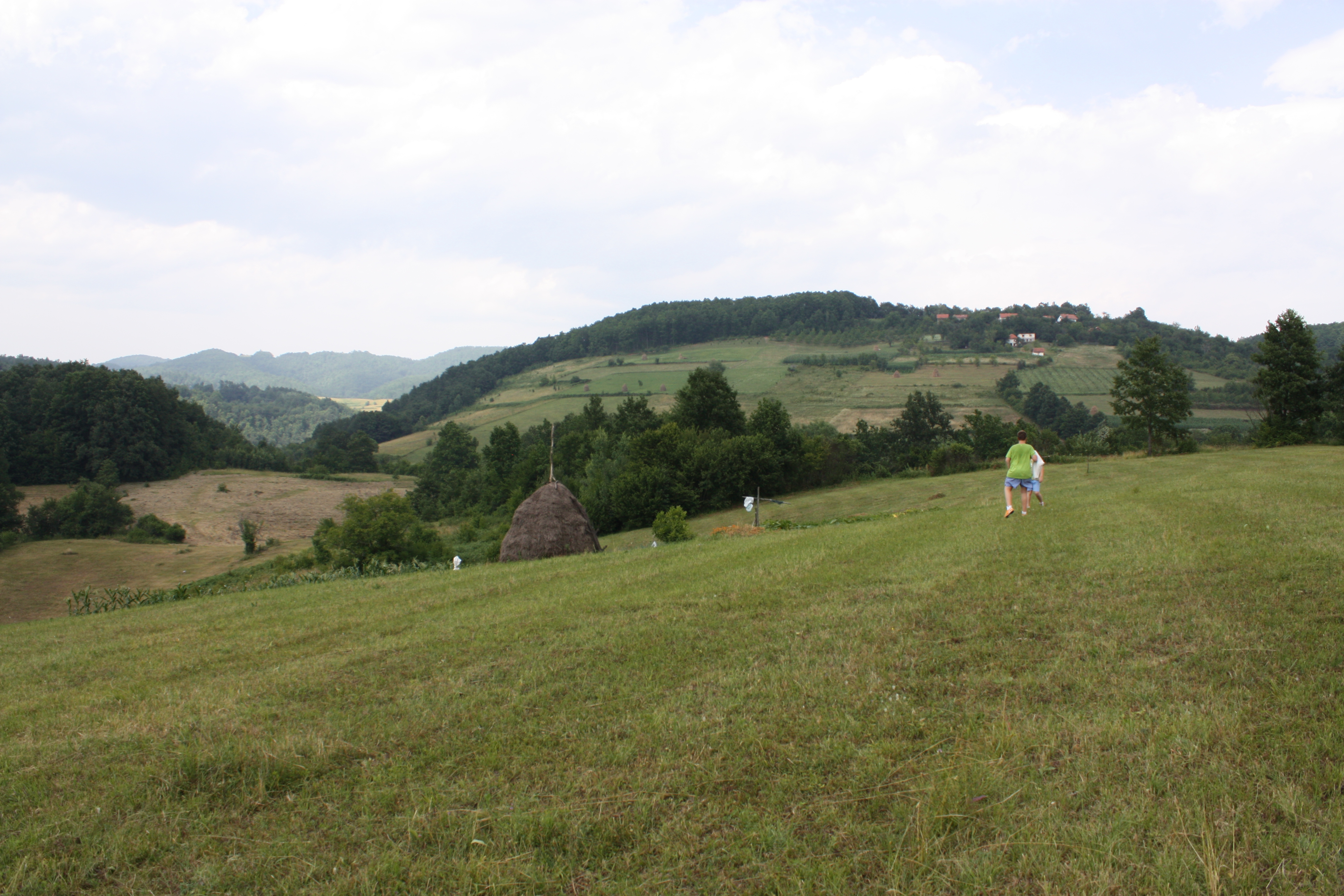
The landscape of Bratunac

The following table gives a preview of total number of registered people employed in professional fields per their core activity (as of 2018):

Professional field	Total
Agriculture, forestry and fishing	43
Mining and quarrying	-
Manufacturing	645
Electricity, gas, steam and air conditioning supply	57
Water supply; sewerage, waste management and remediation activities	50
Construction	94
Wholesale and retail trade, repair of motor vehicles and motorcycles	337
Transportation and storage	58
Accommodation and food services	118
Information and communication	11
Financial and insurance activities	25
Real estate activities	1
Professional, scientific and technical activities	30
Administrative and support service activities	6
Public administration and defense; compulsory social security	147
Education	266
Human health and social work activities	95
Arts, entertainment and recreation	11
Other service activities	56
Total	2,050

== Notable people ==
- Sara Ćirković, boxer

== See also ==
- Municipalities of Republika Srpska
- Konjević Polje
- Kravica attack
