= Novoseoci massacre =

1992 mass murder in Bosnia and Herzegovina

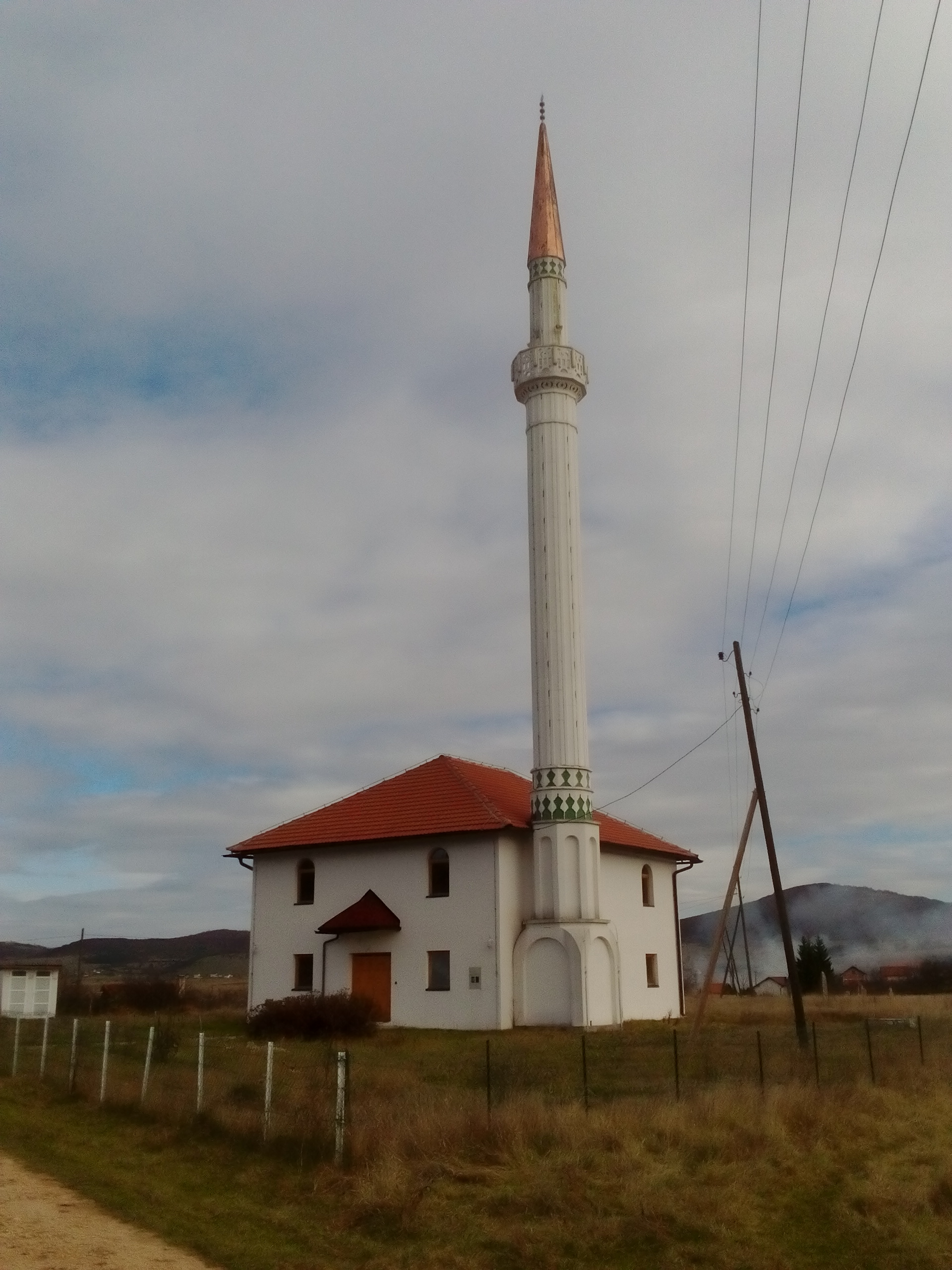
- Mosque of Novoseoci, destroyed after the massacre, rebuilt in 2007.

- Location: 43°52′47″N 18°47′35″E; Novoseoci, Republic of Bosnia and Herzegovina
- Date: 22 September 1992
- Target: Bosniak civilians
- Attack type: Mass killing and ethnic cleansing
- Deaths: 45
- Perpetrators: 2nd Romanija Motorized Brigade, Army of Republika Srpska

The Novoseoci massacre was the mass murder of 45 Bosniak civilians (44 male, one female) from the neighboring villages of Novoseoci and Pavičići on 22 September 1992, during the Bosnian War. The massacre was committed by the 2nd Romanija Motorized Brigade of the Army of Republika Srpska (VRS).

It consisted of a murder of a woman in Novoseoci, Sokolac municipality, and the massacre of 44 men and boys at the Ivan Polje landfill on the way to Rogatica, Bosnia and Herzegovina. After killing the woman, the VRS transported 44 men and boys six kilometres away to the Ivan Polje landfill, where they shot them dead in two groups. Exhumation at the landfill revealed an additional eight victims from Han Stjenica, Rogatica municipality. A smaller number of sources state that civilians were killed on a meadow in Novoseoci – on the spot, and later transported to Ivan polje. Serb authorities made a landfill over the bodies for local settlements to cover the crime.

== Background ==
At the start of the Bosnian War, the Serb Democratic Party established Serb Autonomous Regions (SAOs) in mostly Serb-inhabited territories, and the Sokolac region fell under the self-proclaimed SAO Romanija. The Bosniaks of the sub-Romanija village of Novoseoci had lived together with the Serbs relatively peacefully.

The residents of Novoseoci pledged to be loyal to the self-proclaimed SAO government, believing that this would save their lives. They surrendered their weapons and signed a pledge of allegiance on July 27, 1992.

Amor Mašović from the Institute for Missing Persons of Bosnia and Herzegovina found out that VRS colonel Aleksa Krsmanović ordered the killing of the entire male population of Novoseoci as revenge for his son Darko, a VRS soldier who died in the battle against the Army of the Republic of Bosnia and Herzegovina (ARBiH) near Olovo.

By September 1, 1992, Novoseoci, Mičivode, Vrhbarje, and Murati were among the last remaining Bosniak settlements in the Sokolac area. Completely encircled by Bosnian Serb forces, these communities did not flee during earlier waves of displacement.

== Massacre ==
On 22 September 1992, under the command of Momčilo Pajić, 300 members of the 2nd Romanija Motorized Brigade of the VRS entered the village of Novoseoci and ordered villagers to leave their homes and group themselves on the Metaljka elevation.

One VRS soldier killed a woman, Devla Karić. Afterward, the VRS forces took the men under the guise that they would be designated for exchange, and deported the women and children to Sarajevo by bus. They stopped at Sokolac, where they raped many women.

The men and boys were then transported to the Ivan Polje landfill, 6 km away, by two TAM-5000 (Dajc) military trucks, and shot dead in two groups. The perpetrators mainly used Zastava M84 machine gun for this crime. Those who survived the initial shooting were subsequently finished off with pistol shots to the head.

== Victims ==
All the victims were captured in Novoseoci, where they found refuge, but not all were residents of Novoseoci. Apart from the one woman who was killed and buried in Novoseoci, it is found that of the victims killed at the landfill, 29 were from Novoseoci, 7 were from the village of Pavičići, 4 were from Kovanj, 2 from other places while two others are unknown. The youngest victim was 14, and the oldest was 85 years old.

== Aftermath ==
To conceal evidence of the murder, the perpetrators initially covered the bodies with sand and gravel. Subsequently, they destroyed the Novoseoci mosque by detonating explosives, using the debris to further obscure the scene. In addition, they transported refuse from nearby settlements to the site, transforming the area into a landfill, which was utilized as such. The victims' bodies remained intact, and only after 2–3 days were they buried in a mass grave dug in the same place. This source also states that the mosque was demolished, and thrown over the bodies on 30 September 1992.

On Radio Romanija, a local radio station loyal to Serb authorities, it was announced that "saboteurs in Novoseoci were successfully defeated and liquidated".

The perpetrators also called the female victims who were in exile in the months after, presenting themselves as their murdered members, saying that they were in foreign countries.

Slaviša Cvjetinović, a direct perpetrator of the massacre, and a murderer of a woman in the village, allegedly committed suicide afterwards.

== Exhumation and reburial ==
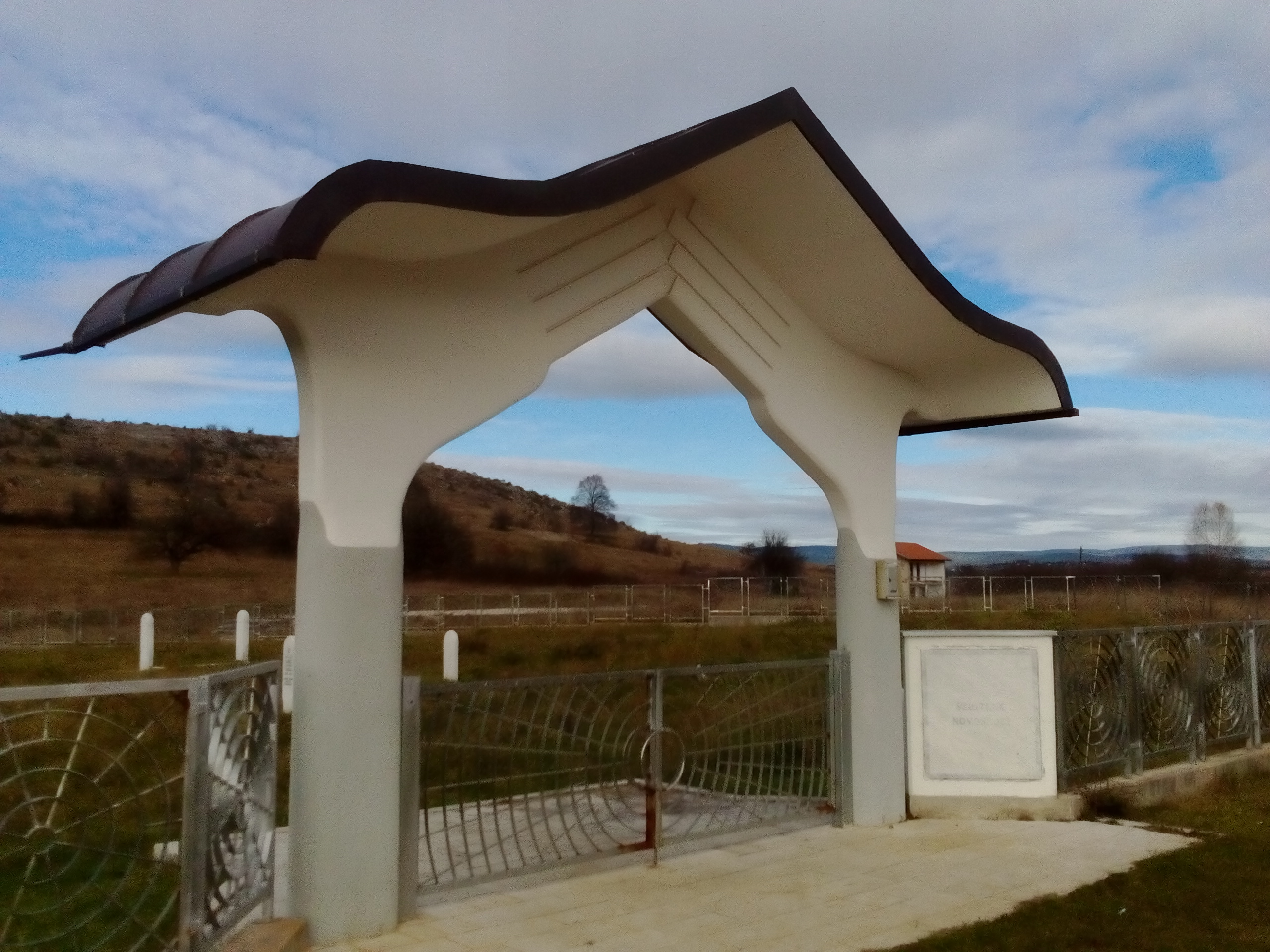
Entrance to the Martyrs' Cemetery in Novoseoci

On 8 September 2000, five years after the end of the war, an exhumation was performed on the Ivan Polje landfill, by the Bosnian Commission for Missing Persons. A local Serb who wished to remain anonymous marked the location of a mass grave containing victims, which led to the discovery of the bodies.

All the victims, except for the remains of one (Amir Selmanović), were discovered, exhumed, and identified, and as many as 178 gunshot wounds were found in the remains. Additional eight remains at the site were found to be from Han Stjenica village, Rogatica, killed in one of subsequent massacres.

The victims were reburied at the Martyrs' Cemetery in Novoseoci, opposite the mosque that was rebuilt in 2007.

== Trials ==
The indictment was created by order of the Special Department for War Crimes and refers to suspects:

- Milan Tupajić, born in 1954, Knežina, Sokolac, former president of the Sokolac Crisis Staff
- Dragomir Obradović "Dragan", born in 1950 in Krševi, Sokolac, former commander of the SJB Sokolac
- Momčilo Pajić, born in 1955, in Sijerci, Sokolac, former commander of the Military Police of the 2nd Romanija Motorised Brigade
- Aleksa Gordić, born in 1968 in Han Pijesak, former deputy commander of the Military Police
- Nikola Koprivica, born in 1954, a member of the Military Police Company 2nd Romanija Motorized Brigade, resides in Canada, (extradition from Canada was requested)
- Miladin Gašević "Ćirko", born in 1961, Vidrići, Sokolac, deputy commander of the 2nd Romanija Motorized Brigade Reconnaissance Company
- Momir Kezunović, born in 1957, Vidrići, Sokolac, member of the Scout Company 2nd Romanija Motorized Brigade
- Branislav Kezunović "Miki", born in 1959, in Vidrići, Sokolac, a member of the Scout Company 2nd Romanija Motorized Brigade
- Željko Gašević, born in 1968, Sokolac, member of the Scout Company 2nd Romanija Motorized Brigade
- Jadranko Šuka, born in 1957, Sokolac, member of the Scout Company 2nd Romanija Motorized Brigade

On 16 September 2020, on suspicion that they had committed a war crime, former SDS deputy Milan Tupajić, wartime commander of PS Sokolac Dragan Obradović, members of VRS Miladin Gašović, Jadranko Šuka, Željko Gašović, Momir Kezunović, and Branislav Kezunović were all arrested.

Milan Tupajić died in December 2021, during the trial.

Radislav Krstić, former commander of the 2nd Romanija Motorized Brigade of the VRS, was also implicated in crime in Novoseoci by a witness. Krstić was already serving a 35 year prison sentence for his role as a commander in the Army of Republika Srpska during the Srebrenica genocide, which occurred 3 years after the Novoseoci massacre.

On 4 April 2022, Nikola Koprivica was extradited from Canada, accused of directly shooting civilians in Novoseoci.

On 3 September 2026, the prosecution presented its closing arguments and requested the strictest penalties for the accused. The prosecution argued that the crimes were of particular gravity and emphasized that the accused had shown no remorse for the killings. The prosecution also referred to testimony describing the events in Novoseoci, including the words of one Bosniak resident who, in the context of the killings, said: “Hvala vam, komšije, za ovo” (“Thank you, neighbors, for this”).

=== 2026 Verdict ===
On 2 November 2026, the Court of Bosnia and Herzegovina issued a first-instance verdict, sentencing six former members of the Second Romanija Brigade of the Army of Republika Srpska (VRS) to a combined total of 83 years in prison for the murder of 44 men and the deportation of women and children from Novoseoci.

The court found the defendants guilty of crimes against humanity, establishing that they participated in an ethnic cleansing operation targeting a civilian population that had previously surrendered its weapons and remained loyal to the local authorities in Sokolac. Pajić was sentenced to 20 years, Miladin Gašević to 15 years, while Kezunović, Željko Gašević, Šuka, and Koprivica were each sentenced to 12 years in prison.

The trial chamber concluded that after the separation of women and children, who were deported by bus towards Sarajevo, the remaining 44 men were told they were being taken for an exchange. Instead, they were transported in trucks to the Ivan Polje locality, where they were executed by a firing squad near a ravine. Their remains were discovered in 2000, buried under trash and the ruins of the demolished Novoseoci mosque.

Under the same first-instance verdict, Obradović and Gordić were acquitted of all charges, as the prosecution failed to prove their direct involvement or the existence of a joint criminal enterprise. The proceedings against Tupajić and Momir Kezunović were terminated prior to the verdict due to their deaths.

== See also ==
- Mičivode massacre
- List of massacres of Bosniaks
- List of massacres in the Bosnian War
- Bosnian genocide
