= Glasinac =

Karst plateau in Bosnia and Herzegovina

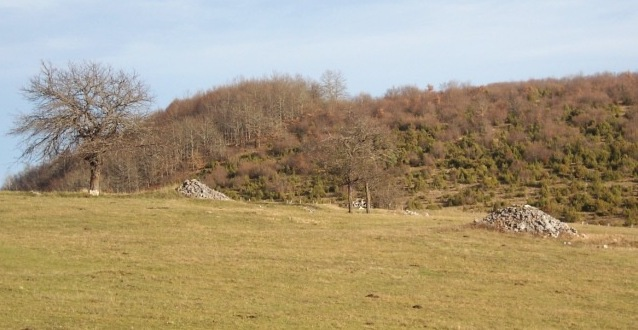
- Landscape on the Glasinac plateau, with a two small tumulus visible

Highest point
- Elevation: 850 m (2,790 ft)
- Coordinates: 43.9053°N 18.8031°E

Dimensions
- Length: 7 km (4.3 mi)
- Area: 22 km^{2} (8.5 mi^{2})

Geography
- Location within Bosnia and Herzegovina
- Location: Bosnia and Herzegovina
- Parent range: Dinaric Alps

Geology
- Mountain type: karst plateau
- Rock type: Karst

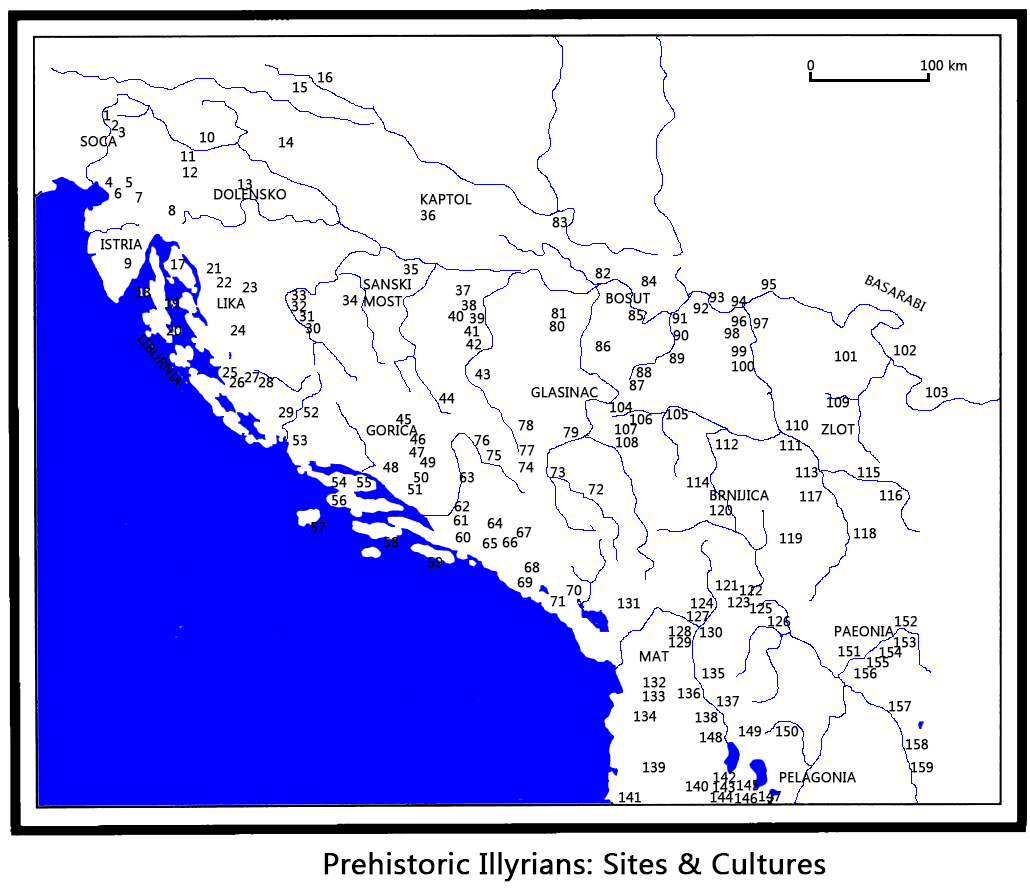
Glasinac na mapi nalazišta iz perioda V-I stoljeća pne.

Glasinac is a karst plateau, situated in the eastern part of Bosnia and Herzegovina, on Romanija mountain, in the middle of Dinaric Alps. The main feature of the plateau is the Glasinačko Polje (transl. Glasinac field), a polje of 22 square kilometres, 7 km long, at an altitude of between 850 and 920 meters. The plateau consists of specious meadows and pastures, characteristic of the eastern part of Bosnia, whose lower levels consists of mostly hard impermeable rocks. The Glasinac plateau is surrounded by coniferous forests and peaks of Romanija, Bogovićka mountain, Gradina, Rab, Crni Vrh, Kopit and Kratelj. Sokolac town is located in the center of Glasinac, and has about 12,000 inhabitants.

It is a location of famous archeological site, known in academia as the Glasinac culture.

== Archeology ==
Glasinac is a well-known archeological site in Bosnia and Herzegovina with remains dating back to Neolithic times, but primarily from Bronze Age and Iron Age. It was the time of the Illyrians, or wider ethnic community, in which the Autariates stood out.

Archaeologically the term Glasinac is broader than the geographical area it occupy. Due to the abundance of archaeological material in this area, a whole period was called Glasinac culture, which can be traced back from the early Bronze Age to the Early Iron Age.

The first excavations were carried out in 1880 by Austro-Hungarian Lieutenant Johan Leksa, when he found the famous Glasinac carriage, which is taken to the museum in Vienna. Research was continued by Ćiro Truhelka, Đorđe Stratimirović and Franjo Fiala. A total of 1,234 mounds were excavated in the 19th century, about 250 empty.

=== Hill-forts on Glasinac ===
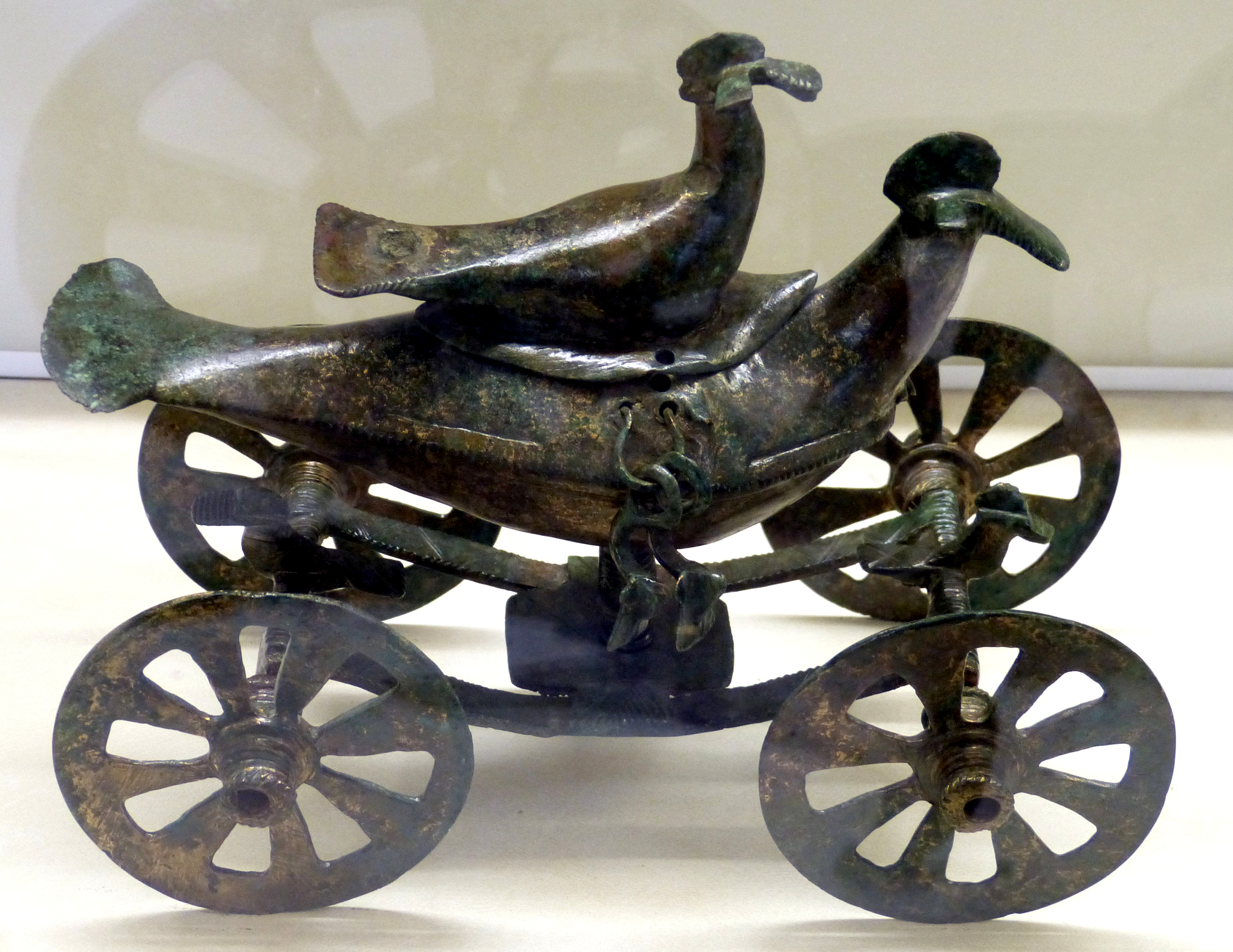
Famous Glasinac bird-cart

Gradina on Glasinac (in antiquity hill-fort, usually positioned on a hill, in Serbo-Croatian: gradina) are an evidence of settlement and Glasinac culture. The first list of forts was made by Ćiro Truhelka, and later the list was expanded with new discoveries. Gradina on Ilijak was the center of a large settlement complex with a long continuity of settlement, and reached its peak in the Old Iron Age. Its existence and findings, discovered from the Gradina settlement itself and its immediate surroundings, are to this day the most important source material of the Glasinac culture of the Early Iron Age. It was the seat of one of the strongest clans on Glasinac, whose existence is proven by the princely necropolises Ilijak and Rajino-brdo. It was discovered in 1893 and excavated in 1893 and 1981.

It is located on a spacious rounded rocky top of the hill, which dominates the spacious surroundings in today's settlement Donja Vinča. It is protected by its natural position and a 356-meter-long rampart. Od svih evidentiranih, najveća je i zauzimala je ukupnu površinu od 16000 m^{2}.

Klisura-Kadića brdo (Serbo-Croatian klisura transl. gorge, brdo transl. hill) is an archeological site in the settlement Kadića Brdo with a hill-fort from the Early Iron Age, semicircular shape 77 with 32 meters. It was discovered in 1880, when it was first explored. During 1980 and 1988 it was researched again. A significant number of well-preserved archeological findings during excavations in 1988 have been collected here. The remains of animal bones found can be used to reconstruct the prehistoric economy of this settlement. The percentage of game is negligible. Surprising are the findings that indicate the existence of fishing in this high-altitude settlement. The purpose of raising domestic animals varied from species to species.

The importance of wool and milk production is confirmed by the large number of weaving vertebrae found (of various sizes and shapes). Their presence indicates the process of spinning and weaving wool. Some of the ceramic forms (such as strainers) were probably used in the production of dairy products. Small cattle are bred nomadically. During the winter, these animals were moved to lowland pastures, which were protected from the harsh weather conditions of this highland area.

All hill-forts of Glasinac culture on Glasinac plateau

Klisura-Kadića brdo - Gradina on Glasinac - Girsko brdo 2 – Borovac 3 – Gradina on Ilijak - Ilijak-Zagrađe 4 – Križevac - Berkovići – Bukovik – Liješće – Pediše – Bijela voda – Šahinski Grad – Vitez - Pohovac (discovered 1890, excavated 1977) – Pliješ – Bjelosavljevići – Velika gradina Novoseoci (discovered 1890) – Mala gradina (Novoseoci) – Buljukovina – Vitanj – Loznik (discovered in 1893, excavated in 1979) – Miošići – Ilijak-Vinogradi – Prisoje I – Prisoje II – Zidina Košutica – Vjetrenik Košutica – Margetići – Sokolac – Staro selo – Šuke-Kusače – Kusače I – Kusače II - Dolovi –Amovići – Hreljin Grad – Mlađ – Šenkovići I – Šenkovići II – Vrbarje – Vrlazije (discovered 1894, excavated 1978) – Kramer selo – Vuškovići – Golubovići I – Golubovići II – Kovanje – Gulija – Kopljevići – Gradina Dumanjići – Pračšići – Laznica – Ilijak-Sjeversko – Gradac-Osovo – Kik-Osovo – Ilića kuća-Osovo - Rujnik

=== Tumulus on Glasinac ===
A total of 1,234 mounds were excavated in the 19th century, about 250 empty. There are also cremation and skeletal graves in the tumulus, in which numerous grave goods were found (metal tools, weapons and jewelry, ceramics). These side dishes are mostly domestic products, with local characteristics.

=== Location Ilijak ===
Tumuli na Ilijaku is a group tumulus next to the Illyrian gradina Ilijak, 3 km away from Hrenovica, municipality of Pale-Prača, Bosnia and Herzegovina. The name Ilijak is used in academic literature, while the local population uses the name Vinograd-Gornja Vinča in the settlement of Donja Vinča.

The increasing use of iron accelerates the social development of Autariates communities during the 8th and especially in 7th BCE. There is a social differentiation and strengthening of power and stabilization of the position of certain local, "princely dynasties", which impose their authority in certain areas. The best evidence of this process is provided in science by the well-known princely tombs, with the rich and varied material found in them.

=== Research ===
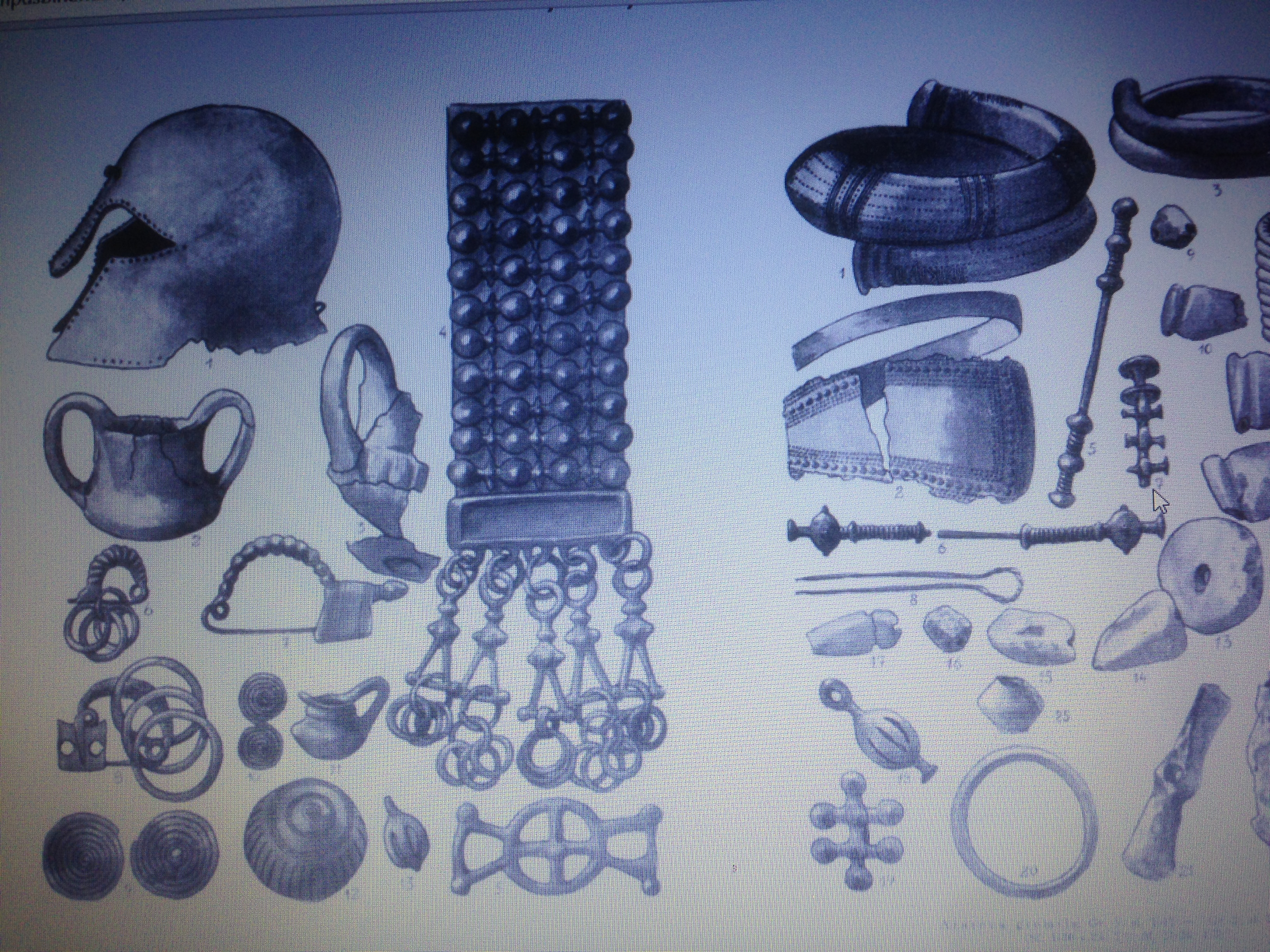
Arareva gromila on Glasinac

During 1893 and 1894 Franjo Fiala excavated 36 tumulus in the vicinity of Ilijak and Rajino Brdo, some of which were princely tombs.

In tomb II, 1 were found a large number of bronze buckles, bronze knemides, a double-edged iron sword with a bronze beautifully decorated hilt, numerous spikes of iron spears, a scepter, an amber necklace, bracelets, belt buckles. Bronze vessels imported from the south Italy were found, of which the ribbed bowl used for cult purposes, as a vessel for pouring liquid sacrifices, is particularly interesting.

In the second grave III, 9 buried individual was found who was in very close contact with the deceased from grave II, 1. In this grave were found two war axes, two double-edged iron swords and bronze knemides with depictions of ships. In addition to the war equipment in III, 9, there is also a belt buckle, 2 small earthen cups for drinking, and some jewelry (tiaras and bracelets). Eight more people were buried in the same tumulus, 2 of them women with quite rich grave goods made up of jewelry, and 1 child.

On Rajino Brdo, the prince's tomb was found in a tumulus which Fiala marked as Ilijak XIII, 1 and its origin dates back to the transition between 7th and 6th BCE. This prince's tomb, in addition to rich jewelry, offensive weapons (double-edged sword, long spear and several fragments of spears and one knife), defensive weapons (bronze knemides with deer images) and bronze vessels also contained a scepter, similar in shape to the one found in the Ilijak necropolis.

The area around Ilijak is named Ilijak principality (Ilijačka kneževina) in the literature, the ruling class is Ilijak dynasty (Ilijačka dinastija). There were seven principalities in the whole area Glasinac culture (or tribes of the Autariates).

== Middle Ages ==
Glasinac is mentioned several times during the 15th century. These mentions show that it was a caravan station that developed as a traffic point between the coastal and Herzegovinian areas with the interior of the medieval Bosnian state, primarily with the area of central Bosnia (Olovo) and the middle Podrinje (Srebrenica). Information from June 1428 show that there was a church in the area of Glasinac during the 15th century. Vlach Radosav Milićiević promised to the Dubrovnik nobleman Ivan Saraka and his companions to transport 17 loads of their goods from Dubrovnik to Glasinac near the church. The price of the contracted transport was 5.5 perpers of Dubrovnik dinars.

== See also ==
- Autariates

== Bibliography ==
- Čović, Borivoj (1976). OD BUTMIRA DO ILIRA. Veselin Masleša, Sarajevo.
- Papazoglu, Fanula (1969). Srednjobalkanska plemena u predrimsko doba. Tribali, Autarijati, Dardanci, Skordisci i Mezi (PDF). ANUBiH, Sarajevo. Archived from the original (PDF) on 23 September 2018.
