= Blagoje Govedarica =

Bosnian-Herzegovinian archaeologist

Blagoje Govedarica (born November 18, 1949) is a Yugoslav and Bosnian-Herzegovinian archaeologist. Born and educated in Serbia and later Germany, he specialized in human prehistory.

== Biography ==
Govedarica was born on November 18, 1949, in Bačko Dobro Polje, SAP Vojvodina, SR Serbia. His parents hail from Gacko in Bosnia and Herzegovina originally, from where they moved to Vojvodina after the end of World War II. They moved back to their hometown but soon moved again, this time permanently settling in Nikšić, SR Montenegro. Blagoje moved with his parents, finishing school in Nikšić, before leaving for Belgrade to study archeology and Illyrology at the Faculty of Philosophy in Belgrade and eventually graduate in 1973, and receive his master's degree in 1980. At the same faculty, he received his doctorate in 1988, and he defended his habilitation at the University of Heidelberg in 2000.

In 1973, he started working at the Centar za balkanološka ispitivanja (Center for Balkanological Research) in Sarajevo, where he is direktor. He is also a scientific advisor (consultant) in the department for the archaeology, protection and preservation of cultural monuments. The subjects of his research are the Eneolithic, Bronze and Iron Age periods. Since 1992, he has been working in Germany, where, in addition to scientific research, he is also engaged in pedagogical work at the universities in Heidelberg and Berlin. Since 2001, he has been the editor-in-chief of the magazine Godišnjak/Jahrbuch published by ANUBiH in Sarajevo. He is a corresponding member of ANUBiH and the German Archaeological Institute.

== Research ==
He conducted archaeological excavations at more than 50 archaeological sites in Bosnia and Herzegovina, Croatia, Germany, Moldova and Ukraine.

- Prehistoric settlement (fortress) Klisura in Kadića Brdo near Sokolac;
- Revision research of the tumulus at Glasinac (Kusače, Podilijak);
- Systematic research of hillforts in southwestern Bosnia (Glamočko Polje, Livanjsko Polje and Duvanjsko Polje) together with Alojz Benac. The results of these researches will contribute to the definition of the Dinaric culture (Posušje culture according to Borivoj Čović);
- Prehistoric burial mounds (tumuli) in Kupreško Polje;
- Prehistoric hill settlements in Sinjsko Polje (Croatia);
- Prehistoric settlement and necropolis Waltersdorf near Berlin (Germany);
- Prehistoric settlement Rathsdorf near Prenzlau (Germany);
- Cealic Prehistoric Settlement, Taraclia Region (Moldova);
- Prehistoric Necropolis of Košary, Odesa Region (Ukraine);
- Multi-level settlement Orlovka-Kartal, Odesa Region (Ukraine).

== Published works ==
So far, Govedarica has published over 100 scientific papers and two monographs, and edited and published a large number of magazines, anthologies and other scientific publications.

- Early Bronze Age in the Eastern Adriatic, Sarajevo, 1989.
- Contributions to the cultural stratigraphy of prehistoric hillforts in southwestern Bosnia.^{[6]}
- Zepterträger–Herrscher der Steppen (Les porteurs de sceptre - les seigneurs des Steppes). Mainz 2004.
- Oscilacije nivoa Crnog Mora i kulturni razvoj jugoistočne Evrope u vrijeme srednjeg holocena (ca. 6000-• 3000 BC). Starinar, Beograd, 53-54/2004, 9-21.
- Finds of the Cetina type in the western Balkans hinterland and the issue of cultural and historical interpretation in the prehistoric archaeology. Vjesnik za Arheologiju i Povijest Dalmatinsku 99. Split 2006, 27–41.
- The ideological significance of burial tumuli and the sacred symbolism of the circle, Godišnjak/Jahrbuch 39, Sarajevo 2010, 5-22.
- Center and periphery in the 5th millennium BC: on the emergence and spread of the European Copper Age. Prähistorische Archäologie in Südosteuropa 25. Rahden/Westf.: Leidorf 2009, 60–73.
- The Phenomenon of the Balkan Copper Age.(Prähistorische Archäologie in Südosteuropa 30. Rahden/Westf.: Leidorf 2016, 11–22.
- The stratigraphy of Tumulus 6 in Shtoj and the appearance of violin idols in the south Adriatic region. Godišnjak/Jahrbuch 45. Sarajevo 2016, 32–51.
