= Grbići =

Grbići may refer to:

- Grbići (Sokolac), a village in Bosnia and Herzegovina
- Grbići (Trebinje), a village in Bosnia and Herzegovina
