= Džindići =

Džindići may refer to the following places in Bosnia and Herzegovina:

- Džindići (Goražde)
- Džindići (Sokolac)
- Džindići, Visoko
