= Žulj =

Žulj may refer to:

- Žulj, Bosnia and Herzegovina, a village near Sokolac
- Žulj (surname)
