= Mičivode massacre =

1992 mass murder in Bosnia and Herzegovina

- Location: 43°59′6″N 18°55′35″E; Mičivode, Republic of Bosnia and Herzegovina
- Date: 20 September 1992
- Target: Bosniak civilians
- Attack type: Mass killing and ethnic cleansing
- Deaths: 42
- Perpetrator: Army of Republika Srpska

Mičivode massacre was the mass murder of 42 Bosniak civilians, including several minors, on September 20, 1992. This act was carried out by members of the Army of Republika Srpska (VRS) in the village of Mičivode, which is located in the Sokolac municipality of Bosnia and Herzegovina.

The massacre unfolded when the VRS forces began targeting Bosniak homes along the Sokolac-Han Pijesak road. Following the initial shelling, Serb soldiers entered the village of Mičivode, initiating a spree of violence. The village consisted solely of unarmed civilians, with no means to defend themselves. Among the survivors was Merdan Murtić, who managed to escape the massacre by fleeing into the nearby forest. He endured several days of hardship before eventually reaching a safe area.

Despite the passage of time, there has been a lack of accountability for the massacre. The families of the victims have provided detailed information and evidence to the relevant authorities, urging them to initiate a criminal investigation into the war crimes committed against the civilian population. As of September 2023, the pursuit of justice remains resolute, as the survivors and their families persist in their determination to ensure that those responsible are held accountable.

== See also ==
- Novoseoci massacre
- List of massacres of Bosniaks
- List of massacres in the Bosnian War
- Bosnian genocide
