= Gornji Poretak =

- Village
- Location within Bosnia and Herzegovina
- Coordinates: 43°59′01″N 18°35′33″E
- Country: Bosnia and Herzegovina
- Entity: Republika Srpska
- Municipality: Sokolac
- Time zone: UTC+1 (CET)
  - Summer (DST): UTC+2 (CEST)

Gornji Poretak (Serbian: Горњи Поретак) is a village in the municipality of Sokolac, Bosnia and Herzegovina.
