= 2nd Romanija Motorized Brigade =

- 2. романијска моторизована бригада
- Active: May 21, 1992—1996
- Country: Republic of Bosnia and Herzegovina (rebelled against)
- Allegiance: Republika Srpska
- Branch: Army of Republika Srpska
- Type: Motorized infantry
- Size: 2,100
- Engagements: Operation Drina
- Decorations

Commanders
- Former commander: Veljko Bosanac
- Former commander: Radislav Krstić
- Former commander: Mirko Trivić
- Former commander: Radovan Vidović

The 2nd Romanija Motorized Brigade was a motorized unit of the Army of Republika Srpska (VRS) within the Drina Corps. According to preliminary estimates, the brigade had over 7,000 fighters.

== History ==
It was formed on May 21, 1992, in Sokolac. It was part of the Sarajevo-Romanija Corps of the VRS. The brigade's command post was in the village of Knežina. The brigade was formed from Territorial Defense units from the municipalities of Sokolac, Han Pijesak, East Stari Grad (parts of Sarajevo), and units from the villages of Nišići and Okruglica, as well as members of the Yugoslav People's Army (JNA), Serbs from smaller units that withdrew from the Zenica area to the territory of the municipality of Sokolac, and from there to the Federal Republic of Yugoslavia (FRY). In August 1992, a battalion consisting of fighters from the area of the municipality of Olovo under VRS control joined the brigade. On 1 November 1992, the brigade became part of the Drina Corps of the VRS. It remained there until the reorganization of the VRS in 1996, when, by merging with the 1st Romanian Motorized Brigade, it became part of the 7th Corps of VRS as the 712th Motorized Brigade, and in 1997, as the 5th Corps of the VRS, as the 512th Motorized Brigade. When it was transferred to the Drina Corps, some units of the 2nd Romanian Motorized Brigade became part of the 1st Romanian Motorized Brigade, which was part of the Sarajevo-Romania Corps. The brigade had a command, staff units, ten motorized battalions, an armored-mechanized battalion, an artillery division, and a rear battalion. At the end of 1992, the brigade had about 7,000 fighters.

The brigade commanders were Lieutenant Colonels Veljko Bosanac, Radislav Krstić (end of 1992 - end of 1994), Mirko Trivić (until the end of 1995), and Radovan Vidović. After its formation, the brigade (as part of the Sarajevo-Romanija Corps) covered the defense zone in the area of the municipalities of Olovo, Han Pijesak, Sokolac, Pale, Istocni Stari Grad, and the villages of Nišići and Okruglica. The brigade controlled a vast defensive area. Upon joining the Drina Corps, the defense zone included the areas of Olovo and Kladnje, from Nišići to Milan Mountain (Sokolina). Units of the brigade also participated in battles in the Drina Corps zone in the Rogatica and Višegrad areas, on Majevica in the Zvornik Brigade's area of responsibility, in the Srebrenica area in the Bratunac Brigade's area, on Treskavica in the Sarajevo-Romanija Corps zone, in the 2nd Krajina Corps zone in the Glamoč, Grahovo and Drvar areas. The brigade was awarded the Order of Nemanjić (30 May 1996).

During the 1992-1995 war, 186 members of this brigade were killed. After the war, about 300 war invalids remained. The brigade suffered significant losses on 4 June 1992. Then, its unit from Pale was ambushed in the Žepa area, below the Brloška Planina mountain, while delivering food and water to soldiers at the Veliki Žepa radio relay hub, even though an agreement had been reached with the Bosnian forces in Žepa on unhindered passage. 58 soldiers died that day due to inadequate combat security measures. The brigade's memorial room is located in Sokolac, where there is also a memorial to the brigade's fallen soldiers.

== War crimes ==
=== Novoseoci massacre ===
The 2nd Romanian brigade committed war crimes in the village of Novoseoci, killing 45 Bosniak civilians (44 men, 1 woman), destroying the mosque, and forcibly expelling women and children from the village. There are currently trials in front of the Court of Bosnia and Herzegovina against members of this brigade.
