= Donji Drapnići =

Coordinates: 44°04′56″N 18°42′21″E

- Village
- Interactive map of Donji Drapnići
- Country: Bosnia and Herzegovina
- Entity: Republika Srpska
- Municipality: Sokolac
- Time zone: UTC+1 (CET)
  - Summer (DST): UTC+2 (CEST)

Donji Drapnići (Serbian: Доњи Драпнићи) is a village in the municipality of Sokolac, Bosnia and Herzegovina.
