= Govedarica =

Govedarica (Serbian Cyrillic: Говедарица, pronounced [ɡoʋedǎːritsa]) is a Serbian surname, derived from govedar, "cowboy". It may refer to:

- Bato Govedarica (1928–2006), American basketball player
- Blagoje Govedarica (born 1949), Yugoslav and Bosnian-Herzegovinian archaeologist
- Dejan Govedarica (b. 1969), Serbian footballer
- Aleksandar Govedarica (born 2006), Australian Tennis Player
