= Pavičići =

Pavičići may refer to:

- Pavičići, Bosnia and Herzegovina, a village near Sokolac
- Pavičići, Croatia, a village near Netretić
