= Radislav Krstić =

Bosnian Serb war criminal (born 1948)

- Радислав Крстић
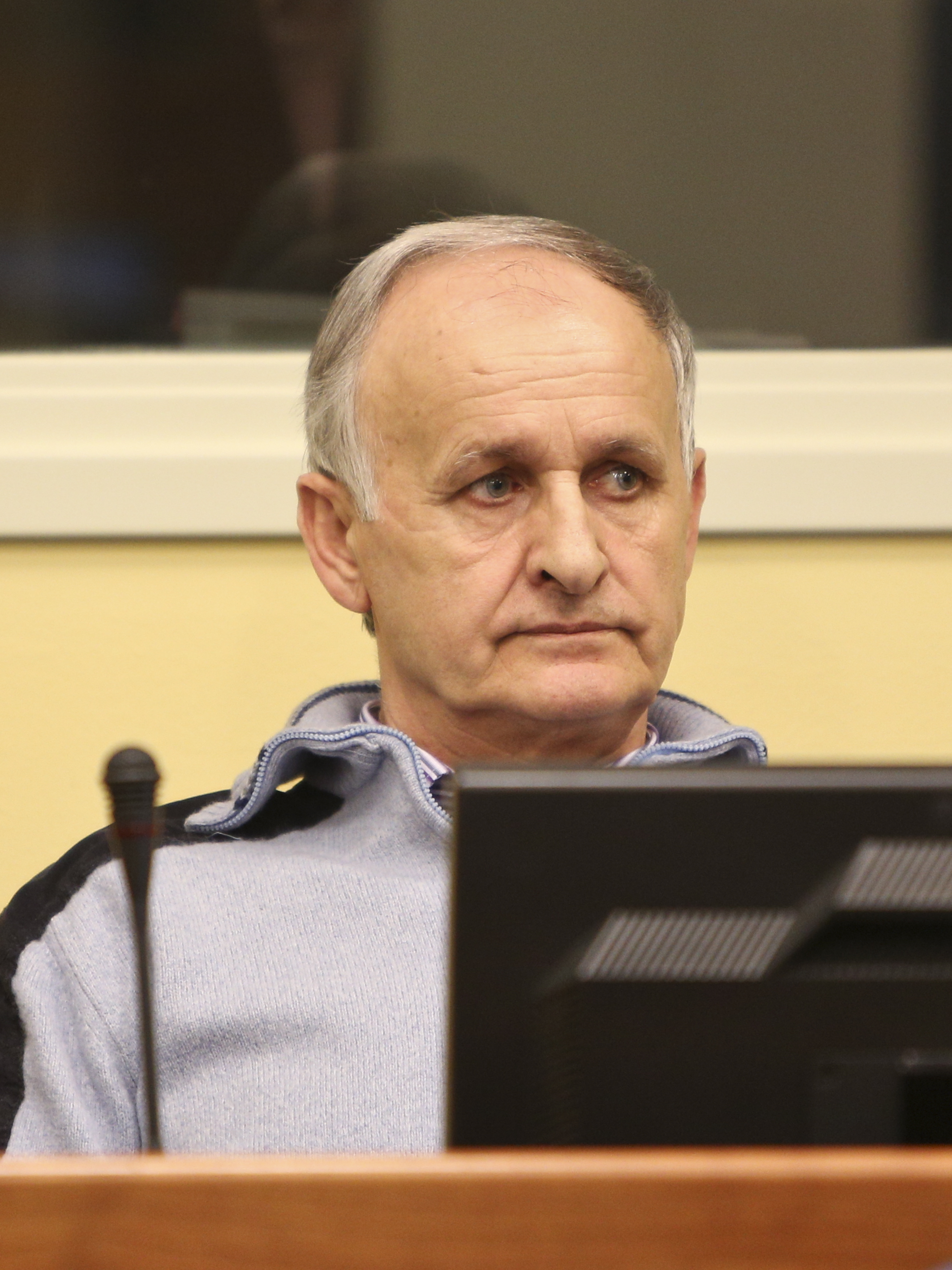
- Krstić on trial at The Hague in 2013
- Born: 15 February 1948 (age 78); Vlasenica, Yugoslavia
- Convictions: Aiding and abetting genocide
- Penalty: 46 years imprisonment, reduced to 35 years imprisonment

Details
- Victims: 8,000
- Date: July 1995; 31 years ago
- Country: Bosnia and Herzegovina
- Date apprehended: December 2, 1998
- Imprisoned at: Tartu Prison
- Military career
- Allegiance: SFR Yugoslavia; Republic of Serbian Krajina; Republika Srpska
- Branch: Yugoslav People's Army; Army of Republika Srpska
- Service years: 1967–1995
- Rank: Major general
- Commands: Yugoslav People's Army; Priština Corps; 2nd Military District Headquarters; Army of Republika Srpska
- Conflicts: Bosnian War: Siege of Goražde; Siege of Srebrenica; Siege of Žepa

Radislav Krstić (Serbian Cyrillic: Радислав Крстић; born 15 February 1948) is a former Bosnian Serb Deputy Commander and later Chief of Staff of the Drina Corps of the Army of Republika Srpska (the "Bosnian Serb army") from October 1994 until 12 July 1995. He was promoted to the rank of major general in June 1995 and assumed command of the Drina Corps on 13 July 1995.

In 1998 Krstić was indicted for war crimes by the International Criminal Tribunal for the Former Yugoslavia in The Hague in connection with the genocide of around 8,000 Bosniak prisoners of war and civilians on 11 July 1995 during the Srebrenica massacre. On 2 August 2001, Krstić became the first man convicted of genocide by the Tribunal, and was sentenced to 46 years in prison. He was only the third person ever to have been convicted under the 1948 Convention on the Prevention and Punishment of the Crime of Genocide. The sentence was subsequently shortened to 35 years in prison when an appeal court upheld a lesser charge for aiding and abetting genocide.

== Early life and education ==
Krstić was born in Vlasenica, Bosnia and Herzegovina. He attended primary school in Vlasenica and elementary school in Han Pijesak, where he also completed his secondary education in a grammar school. Krstić describes his young years as very peaceful, and the community in which he lived as "heterogeneous" and very tolerant, particularly among the youth.

In 1968, upon completion of his secondary education, he began his university education by enrolling in the military academy in Belgrade. He graduated in 1972, whereupon he became an active duty officer of the former JNA.

== Personal life ==
Krstić is married and has a son Dobroslav and daughter Djerdana.

== Career ==
According to testimony during his trial, Krstić was first assigned to the Sarajevo garrison from 1972 to 1981, where he attended secondary military school at a hub called "Josip Broz Tito". His first assignment was a platoon commander at this secondary military school. He was also a company commander, and was head of his class during his graduating year. Krstić remembers Sarajevo as being unique in Yugoslavia due to its spirit of unity amongst the ethnically diverse population.

Krstić's tour of duty in Sarajevo ended in 1981 when he was posted to the general staff of the Military Academy of Serbia. While this assignment was very sought after by career-minded military officers, Krstić insisted that his family remain in Sarajevo, in the hopes that he might be reassigned there. Upon completion of his education in 1983, however, he was assigned to Negotin, a small town positioned on the borders of Yugoslavia, Bulgaria, and Romania.

In mid-1986, Krstić was reassigned to Priština, in Kosovo, where he was placed in charge of training officers and units in the Priština corps. Due to the unrest that had begun brewing in that region, he was posted to Kosovska Mitrovica in early 1987 as Chief of Staff of the Motorised Brigade. He remained at that post until 1990 when he took over as the brigade commander of that garrison.

=== Role in the Yugoslav wars ===
==== Joining the VRS ====
In mid-1992, after Bosnia proclaimed independence, Krstić decided that, rather than trying to find a place in this new Yugoslavia, he would return to Bosnia as he was born in Bosnia and considered himself to be a citizen of Bosnia. He stayed with his family in Han Pijesak for a short time, and in June 1992, with the Bosnian War already in full swing, he reported to the Han Pijesak garrison and joined the Army of Republika Srpska. He was immediately assigned with the rank of lieutenant colonel to the post of the Commander of the 2nd Romanija Motorized Brigade, which was located in the Sokolac garrison. This brigade was a new experience for Krstić, as it was ethnically homogenous; composed only of ethnic Serbs from the Sokolac municipality, Olovo and Kladanj municipalities, and of the refugees from the Zenica, Kakanj, Breza, and Vareš municipalities.

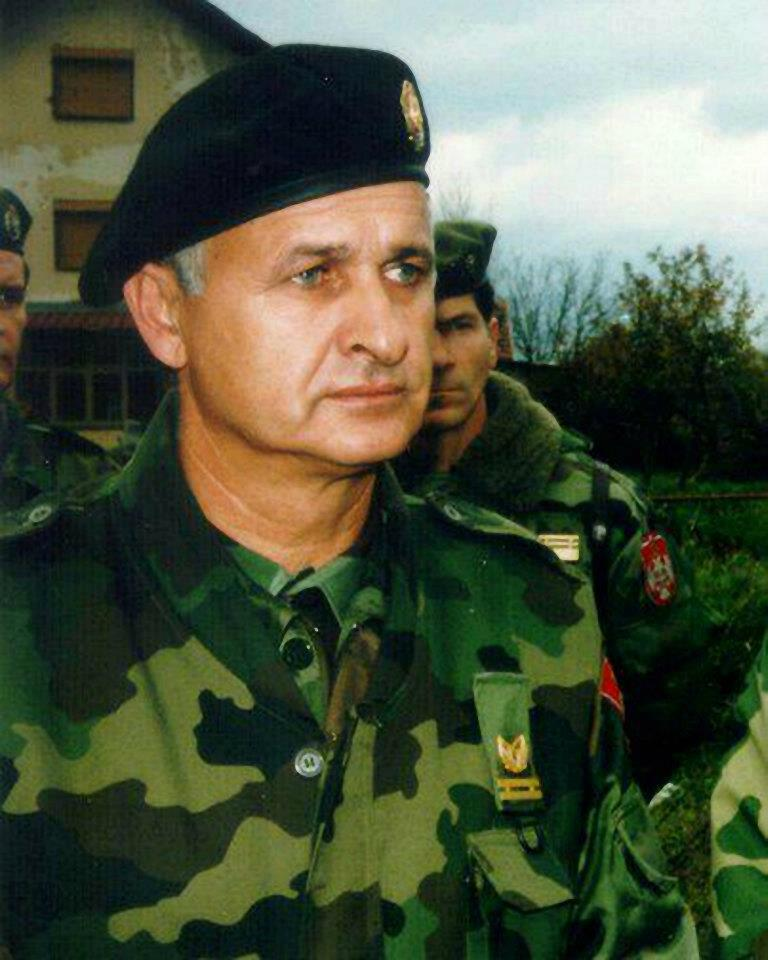
Radislav Krstić in the VRS

==== Early engagements ====
Krstić initially faced problems with command and control due to the inexperience of the officers in the brigade command and their subordinate units. However, the situation rapidly improved, and in October of the same year, he was promoted to the rank of colonel. On the Serbian Orthodox holiday of St. Ilija's Day in August 1993, behind the positions of Krstić's units that were engaged in the front line in the area of Kladanj, there was a synchronised infiltration of Army of the Republic of Bosnia and Herzegovina, and the villages in the territory of the Han Pijesak municipality, such as Žerovice, Rijeka, and Potkosovaca were destroyed and most of their inhabitants killed. In late April of the following year there was a significant effort by the Eastern Bosnia Corps to break through the Kladanj front to capture Vlasenica and link up from the direction of Kladanj with the forces within the protected area of Žepa. The offensive lasted for about 20 days, and it was crushed on 20 May 1994.

==== UN "Safe Area" warnings ====
On 15 August 1994, Krstić was appointed Chief of Staff of the Drina Corps. Krstić worked with his replacement to familiarize him with his roles and function until 1 September, and then worked with the former Chief of Staff whom he would be replacing to learn his new post until 28 September. He was then briefed about Bosnian operations coming from the direction of Tuzla, Živinice, Kladanj, and Olovo against Serbian civilians. His predecessor also briefed him and told him that, despite the status of the safe area accorded to Srebrenica and Žepa and the obligations stemming from agreements on demilitarization, the forces of the 28th Mountain Division of the Eastern Bosnia Corps in Srebrenica and Žepa were, in fact procuring from Tuzla and Kladanj or directly from Sarajevo more weapons in addition to the light or infantry weapons they already had.

There were numerous reports from Serb intelligence sources of the BiH Army troop movements in and out of protected enclaves carrying arms, reconnoitering Serb positions, and other military actions against Tuzla, Živinice, and Kladanj, all using UN protectorates as a base of operations in the region and operating under the radar so as to avoid notice by UNPROFOR. Krstić stayed at his post at the Corps Command until 1 November 1994, whereupon he established a brigade which was deployed at the area of the Herzegovinian Corps to combat the offensive which was mounted by the Eastern Bosnia Corps from the area of Bjelašnica and Igman towards Treskavica and Trnovo. He remained in the area of Treskavica and Trnovo until mid-December 1994, whereupon he returned to his post as the commander of the Corps in Vlasenica.

He was again briefed about the situation with respect to operations that the Bosniak command of the 28th Division in Srebrenica, acting upon orders from the Main Staff of the 2nd Corps in Tuzla, was conducting towards the positions of the Drina Corps, in particular, at the Milici municipality, Han Pijesak, and the Vlasenica municipality. He was also briefed about intel on the continuation of the army, weapons and ammunitions supply to the members of the 28th Brigade at the protected area. They began intercepting communications indicating an attempt by the BiH Army to conduct supply chain operations from Tuzla to link up with their forces in Srebrenica in an operation named "Skakavac" (grasshopper).

==== Landmine injury ====
On 29 December 1994, while inspecting force deployment at Kladanj and Olovo, Krstić stepped on a landmine and was seriously wounded. He was taken to a military hospital in Sokolac where, on 3 January, his right leg below his knee was amputated. He stayed in the military hospital in Meljine until the end of March 1995 when he was transferred to the Military Medical Academy in Belgrade, where he remained until the end of April 1995. He was discharged from the military hospital at his request and stayed for a couple of days with his family in Kosovska Mitrovica, before returning to Bosnia with his wife to report to his doctors in Sokolac and Vlasenica for further treatment. He underwent therapy alternately in Sokolac and Vlasenica until the middle of May 1995, when he returned to his official post.

==== The Bosnian Army offensive ====
Upon returning to his official duties, Krstić was again briefed that activity by Bosnian Muslim forces between Tuzla and the UN protectorates was increasing, and Serb forces were suffering heavy losses to infiltrators. Serb intelligence reported that, despite a no-fly order on much of the area, BiH military helicopters were landing in protected areas daily with munitions and supplies. Noting the buildup toward a major offensive by the BiH Army, the Drina Corps began preparations for a counter-offensive.

On 15 June 1995, forces of the 2nd Corps of the BiH Army launched simultaneous offensives against the 1st Brčanska Brigade, the 1st Zvornik Infantry Brigade, and the 1st Vlasenica Brigade along the Tuzla-Zvornik and Kladanj-Vlasenica axes. There were casualties suffered on both sides, but the Drina Corps made territorial gains in the Kalesija and Osmaci municipalities, and after four days of fighting, the 2nd Corps were driven back to their original positions. The Eastern Bosnia Corps then concentrated their forces on the Tuzla-Zvornik axis, however, and after establishing a bridgehead on the Spreča River, they broke through Serb lines and destroyed the villages of Markovica, much of Osmaca, and the entire village of Zelena. The 28th Division of the 2nd Corps then occupied the villages of Višnjica and Rječice, where they attacked the VRS Main Staff from the direction of Banja Lučica and Krivace. This territory was held until 26 June, when the Drina Corps fortified their defenses and managed to halt and then repel the BiH Army back to their initial positions.

==== Operation Krivaja 95 ====
Since the UN-protected enclaves of Srebrenica and Žepa were never demilitarized, and that they hid what amounted to "five or six brigades" of BiH Army troops and weapons, the VRS Main Staff ordered the Drina Corps Command to undertake an operation codenamed Krivaja 95. This was in response to a 8 March 1995 directive from the Bosnian Serb President Radovan Karadžić himself (although it is believed that Krstić was a co-planner), ordering that "The Command of the Drina Corps, pursuant to operations directive number 7 and 7/1 of the GS VRS, and on the basis of the situation in the Corps area of responsibility, has the task of carrying out offensive activities with free forces deep in the Drina Corps zone, as soon as possible, in order to split apart the enclaves of Žepa and Srebrenica, and to reduce them to their urban areas." The directive went on to detail the need to "complete the physical separation of the Srebrenica and Žepa enclaves as soon as possible, preventing even communication between individuals between the two enclaves. By planned and well-thought-out combat operations, create an unbearable situation of total insecurity, with no hope of further survival or life for the inhabitants of Srebrenica or Žepa.

The operational objective was to, "[b]y a surprise attack, to separate and reduce in size military forces in Srebrenica and Žepa enclaves", as well as, "[t]o improve the tactical position of the forces in the depth of the area and to create conditions for the elimination of the enclaves." Mission parameters included a very accelerated timetable, complete radio silence, a ban on targeting UNPROFOR forces, and the operation was to be managed by several commanders, Krstić among them, from a forward command post in Pribicevac. There was also psychological components to the operation plan. The directive laid out support for combat operations by ordering that "[t]he relevant state and military organs responsible for work with UNPROFOR and humanitarian organisations shall, through the planned and unobtrusively restrictive issuing of permits, reduce and limit the logistics support of UNPROFOR to the enclaves and the supply of material and weapons to the Muslim armies that are hiding inside the safe area, making them dependent on our goodwill while at the same time avoiding condemnation by the International Community and international public opinion." It is believed that operations to this effect actually began three months before the attack in April 1995.

Reconnaissance was carried out from the forward command post at Pribicevac, Besica Brdo, and the Bracan surface mine. Subsequently, the Drina Corps requested that the VRS provide the cooperation of the 65th Protective Motorised Regiment, as well as that of the 1st and 2nd Podrinje Light Infantry Brigades. A sudden flare-up of fierce resistance by the BiH Army against all VRS axes delayed the commencement of the operation by several days, and resources were concentrated on re-acquiring territory lost in these attacks.

==== Srebrenica genocide ====
On 9 July, around 1700 hours, General Ratko Mladić, commander of the VRS main staff, arrived without advance notice at the forward command post in Pribicevac along with other senior VRS Generals to monitor combat operations. Once commanders radioed from the battle theater that they had accomplished their given tasks, Mladić radioed back, "[t]his is Panorama 01. You haven't accomplished your task. Continue the attack. Enter Srebrenica. I am now in command of the forces engaged in this operation." Resistance by the Eastern Bosnia Corps' 28th Division was finally beginning to wane, and Mladić had just effectively relegated Krstić to the role of an observer. Throughout the night and the next day, the VRS pressed forward, making gains in enough key areas to control all of the needed strategic positions to take Srebrenica. It was at this point that NATO fighter pilots in F-16s began flying over the combat operations.

On 11 July 1995 the Bratunac Light Infantry Brigade, reinforced by a unit from the Vlasenica Light Infantry Brigade, began a final push into Srebrenica from the Southeast. At 1430 the two F-16s conducted air strikes against VRS tanks, inflicting some damage during the thirty-minute attack, to which Mladić responded by ordering ground troops to take air attack defense measures, such as the burning of haystacks to create smokescreens.

The Drina Wolves from the 1st Battalion of the Zvornik Brigade were the first VRS soldiers to enter the town of Srebrenica around 1600 that day. After the area was cleared and more forces arrived, Krstić and the other Generals departed the forward command post and reassembled in Srebrenica. Mladić immediately ordered the brigade commanders to press the attack onward to Potočari and Bratunac, but after logistical and other considerations raised by Krstić and Živanović, Mladić ordered troops to hold and stabilize their present lines. That night at a meeting with Mladić, Krstić was placed in charge of infantry forces that would be conducting an overnight march toward Žepa in preparation for combat operations there. At this meeting it was also decided that Živanović would oversee the procurement of buses to remove civilians from Srebrenica to Kladanj.

Krstić visited Potočari at least once, giving a television interview. The extent of his involvement in the ensuing Srebrenica Massacre is not known. The VRS separated the adult male refugees in Potočari from the others, and the latter were loaded to buses and transported to Kladanj. The former were taken in groups to isolated locations such as Čerska Valley, Kravica warehouse, Orahovica, Branjevo Farm, Petkovci Dam and Kozluk, where they were blindfolded, and executed. According to current data, more than 3,000 were killed, with over two thousand people missing.

Seized VRS documents indicated that there were major logistical considerations provided for with regard to the fueling of transport trucks, transporting prisoners, provision of equipment to move earth for digging mass graves, as well as the assignment and provisioning of ammunition for the executions. The following coded communication was intercepted over unsecured lines between VRS Main Staff Security Chief Ljubiša Beara and Krstić, in which Beara was requesting assistance with the disposing of prisoners:

RK: I will see what I can do, but it will disturb a lot. Please, you have some men down there at Nastić's and Blagojević's.
LB: But I don't have any, and if I did—or if I did, I wouldn't still be asking for the third day.
RK: Check with Blagojevic, take his Red Berets.
LB: They're not there. Only four of them are still there. They took off, fuckers. They're not there anymore.
RK: I'll see what I can do.
LB: Check it out and have them go to Drago's. Krle, I don't know what to do anymore.
RK: Ljubo, take those MUP guys from up there.
LB: No, they won't do anything. I talked to them. There is no other solution but those 15 to 30 men with Indjić.
RK: Ljubo, you have to understand me, too. You guys have fucked me up so much.
LB: I understand, but you have to understand me, too. Had this been done then, we wouldn't be arguing over it now.
RK: Oh, now I'll be the one to blame.
LB: I don't know what to do. I mean it, Krle, there are still 3,500 parcels that I have to distribute and I have no solution.
RK: I'll see what I can do.

Krstić then allegedly undertook to arrange that men from the Bratunac Brigade assist with the Branjevo Farm and the Pilica Dom executions.

==== Stupcanica 95 ====
Over the next few days Krstić assembled the commanders from several brigades present in the area that would be contributing some or all of their forces to the Žepa attack (now codenamed Stupcanica 95), including the 1st Zvornik Infantry Brigade, the Bratunac Light Infantry Brigade, the Birač Infantry Brigade, the 2nd Romanija Motorised Brigade, the 1st Podrinje Light Infantry Brigade, the 5th Podrinje Light Infantry Brigade, the 1st Milici Light Infantry Brigade, the 1st Vlasenica Light Infantry Brigade, and the 5th Mixed Artillery Regiment. In Viogora they assembled the Bratunac Brigade, the Milici Brigade, and the Independent Skelani Battalion, marched southward, and arrived at the wider assembly area of Podravanje, Rupovo Brdo, and Bracan. They would be attacking along the line of Podravanje-Orlov Kamen, Zlovrh and on to Žepa.

On 13 July there was a flurry of preparatory measures involving scouring the terrain for remaining members of the 28th Division, organizing mine groups to detect minefields and conduct demining operations, removing obstacles on roads within the protected area as well as roads between units and the staging area for the Žepa operation. Numerous executions of bound prisoners also took place in this region. On 19 July the following conversation between Krstić and Deputy Commander of the 1st Zvornik Infantry Brigade General Dragan Obrenović was intercepted:

RK: Is that you, Obrenović?
DO: Yes.
RK: Krstić here.
DO: How are you General, sir?
RK: I'm great, and you?
DO: Thanks to you I am too.
RK: Way to go, Chief. And how's your health?
DO: It's fine, thank God, it's fine.
RK: Are you working down there?
DO: Of course we're working.
RK: Good.
DO: We've managed to catch a few more, either by gunpoint or in mines.
RK: Kill them all. God damn it.
DO: Everything, everything is going according to plan. Yes.
RK: Not a single one must be left alive.
DO: Everything is going according to plan. Everything.
RK: Way to go, Chief. The Turks are probably listening to us. Let them listen, the motherfuckers.
DO: Yeah, let them.

Despite losing some of his forces in a transfer to augment operations in the Alibegovac and Kak areas, on the morning of 17 July, the march on Žepa commenced, with the attack building to full swing a few days later. The attack was initially slowed down due to terrain features along the attack axes. Žepa fell to the VRS on 1 August 1995.

==== Promotion to Drina Corps Commander ====
Generals Mladić and Tolimir joined Krstić at the forward command post in Krivaca on the day the Žepa attack began and informed him that he (Krstić) would be soon taking over duties as Corps Commander. About a week later, after the forward command post had been moved to Godjenje, Mladić ordered Krstić to travel to a restaurant near Han Pijesak to take over Živanović's post as Corps Commander. There was a formal ceremony, after which Krstić performed some transitory duties and visited his family briefly in Kosovska Mitrovica.

== Post-war ==
In August 1995, Krstić went to Zvornik and joined Obrenović in a review of the right flank of the 7th battalion trenches. A Srebrenica Massacre survivor was heard on a soldier's transistor radio giving an account over the radio broadcast from Tuzla. Krstić ordered that the radio be switched off, with the admonition that they should not listen to enemy radio. He then asked Obrenović if he had issued orders that enemy radio should not be listened to and Obrenović said that he had not. Krstić refused to discuss the executions further.

Krstić was relieved of his duties as Corps Commander on 21 November 1995 and he was sent to the National Defense School in Belgrade. He returned to the Main Staff of the VRS in September 1996 for further deployment, and was appointed to the post of the Chief of Inspection for Combat Readiness of the VRS. He was appointed the Commander of the 5th Corps in April 1998.

=== Indictment by the International Criminal Tribunal for the Former Yugoslavia ===
On 1 November 1998 Krstić was indicted by the International Criminal Tribunal for the Former Yugoslavia in The Hague for genocide, complicity to commit genocide, extermination, two counts of murder, and persecution. On 27 October 1999 the indictment was amended to include one count of deportation and one count of inhumane acts.

==== Arrest ====
On Wednesday, 2 December 1998, Krstić was driving through the village of Vršani on the Bijeljina-Brčko road while en route to Banja Luka on business when his car was disabled by road spikes and he was pulled through his car window and taken into custody in a joint SAS-Navy SEAL operation launched by SFOR. He was immediately transported to the Hague for trial. The Republika Srpska and Yugoslav governments expressed outrage, and even Russia protested against the manner in which Krstić was detained, in that it took place in an area of Bosnia patrolled by the Russian SFOR contingent, which was not apprised of the operation.

==== Trial and sentence ====
Krstić's trial began five days after his arrest on 7 December 1998. Krstić did not deny that war crimes had been committed by the VRS, but he denied that he had issued orders for these actions. He pleaded ignorance and placed the likely responsibility on General Mladić's shoulders. He claimed that he did not participate in either the planning, organizing or ordering of killings and deportations, claiming instead that he concentrated on his attack on Žepa while the bulk of the killings were taking place. He claimed to have known and heard nothing about any atrocities until the event of his own trial. On 2 August 2001 Krstić was convicted on all counts and sentenced to 46 years in prison.

On 15 August 2001, Counsel for Krstić filed a notice of appeal against the Trial Chamber judgement, arguing that the Trial Chamber both misconstrued the legal definition of genocide and erred in applying the definition to several circumstances of the case. The Appeal's Chamber dismissed the appeal with regard to the legal definition of genocide. With regard to factual errors, the Appeal's Chamber on 19 April 2004 dismissed the appeal on some issues, but granted it with regard to other issues. They pronounced him not guilty of genocide, but affirmed his guilt as an aider and abbetor to genocide, thus redefining Krstić's involvement and cutting 11 years from his sentence.

=== Imprisonment ===
On 20 December 2004, Krstić was transferred to the United Kingdom to serve his sentence. On 7 May 2010 in Wakefield Prison where he was serving the sentence, three Muslim inmates attacked Krstić, wounding him seriously. The three men – Indrit Krasniqi, Iliyas Khalid and Quam Ogumbiyi – were sent for trial at Leeds Crown Court. On 18 February 2011, the trio were found guilty of "wounding with intent to commit grievous bodily harm", but were acquitted of attempted murder. The judge sentenced Krasniqi to life with a specified term of 12 years, Khalid to life with a 10-year term and Ogumbiyi, who had played a smaller part in the attack, to life with a six-year term.

Afterwards, Krstić was transferred back to the Netherlands, and he was later transferred to a prison in Piotrków Trybunalski, Poland on 20 March 2014.

In 2024 Krstić filed an request for early release, having served 26 years in prison. In his filing Krstić admitted for the first time that he had taken part in the genocide and was guilty of the crimes for which he was convicted. His request was denied in February 2025. As of April 2025, he will serve his sentence in Tartu Prison, Estonia.
