= Vukosavljevići =

- Village
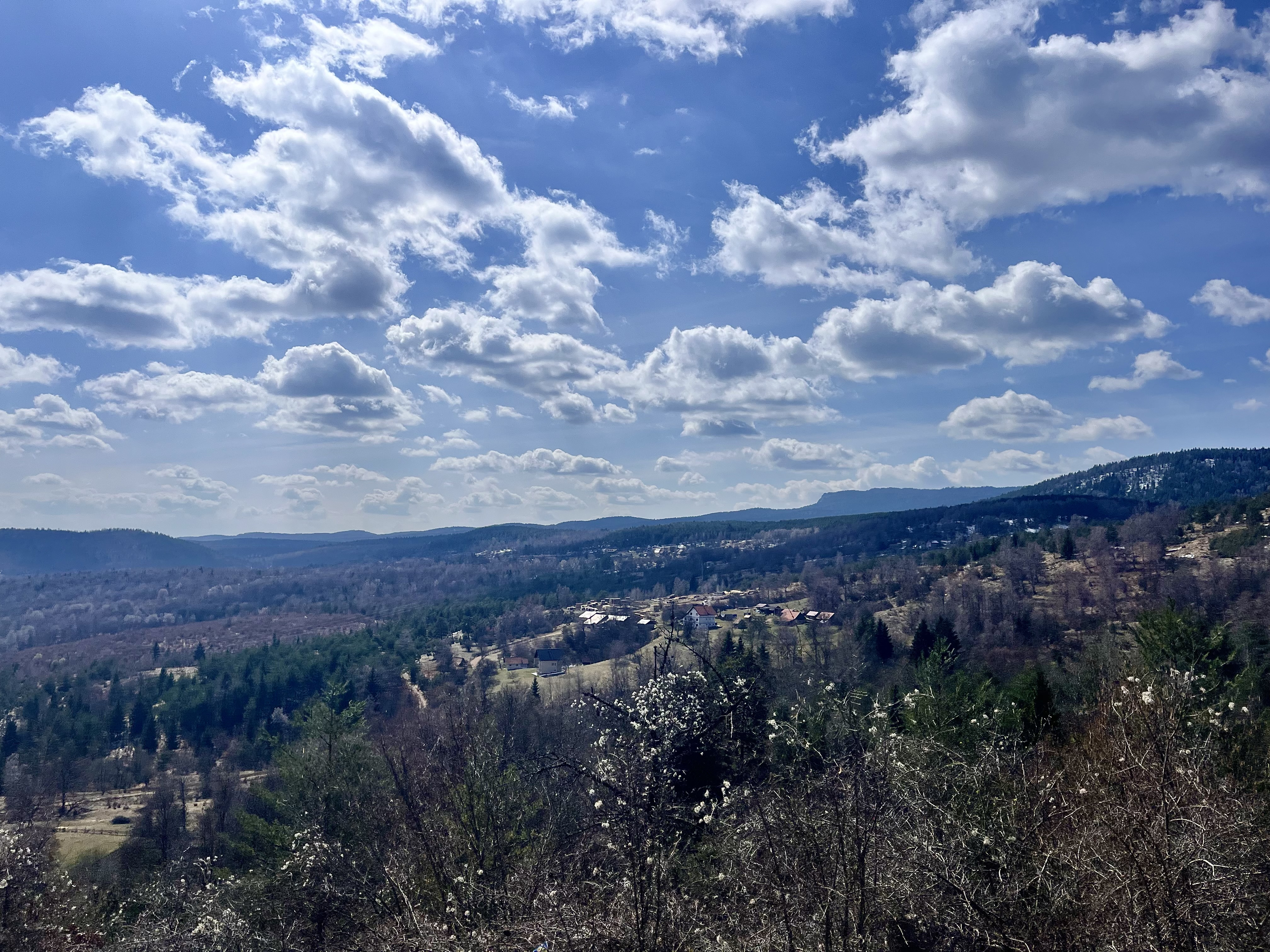

- Location within Bosnia and Herzegovina
- Coordinates: 43°54′11″N 18°44′13″E
- Country: Bosnia and Herzegovina
- Entity: Republika Srpska
- Municipality: Sokolac
- Time zone: UTC+1 (CET)
  - Summer (DST): UTC+2 (CEST)

Vukosavljevići (Serbian: Вукосављевићи) is a village in the municipality of Sokolac, Bosnia and Herzegovina.
