= Vidrići =

- Village
- Location within Bosnia and Herzegovina
- Coordinates: 43°56′56″N 18°50′04″E
- Country: Bosnia and Herzegovina
- Entity: Republika Srpska
- Municipality: Sokolac
- Time zone: UTC+1 (CET)
  - Summer (DST): UTC+2 (CEST)

Vidrići (Serbian: Видрићи) is a village in the municipality of Sokolac, Bosnia and Herzegovina.
