= Sijerci =

- Village
- Location within Bosnia and Herzegovina
- Coordinates: 43°56′42″N 18°52′31″E
- Country: Bosnia and Herzegovina
- Entity: Republika Srpska
- Municipality: Sokolac

Population (1991)
  - Total: 57
- Time zone: UTC+1 (CET)
  - Summer (DST): UTC+2 (CEST)

Sijerci (Serbian: Сијерци) is a village in the municipality of Sokolac, Bosnia and Herzegovina.
