= Bijela Voda (Sokolac) =

Coordinates: 43.9511°N 18.7289°E

- Village
- Interactive map of Bijela Voda
- Country: Bosnia and Herzegovina
- Entity: Republika Srpska
- Municipality: Sokolac
- Time zone: UTC+1 (CET)
  - Summer (DST): UTC+2 (CEST)

Bijela Voda (Sokolac) is a village in the municipality of Sokolac, Bosnia and Herzegovina.
