= Žunovi =

- Village
- Location within Bosnia and Herzegovina
- Coordinates: 44°02′37″N 18°39′24″E
- Country: Bosnia and Herzegovina
- Entity: Republika Srpska
- Municipality: Sokolac
- Time zone: UTC+1 (CET)
  - Summer (DST): UTC+2 (CEST)

Žunovi (Serbian: Жунови) is a village in the municipality of Sokolac, Bosnia and Herzegovina.
