= Vrapci, Sokolac =

Vrapci
- Village
- Location within Bosnia and Herzegovina
- Coordinates: 44°02′01″N 18°46′43″E
- Country: Bosnia and Herzegovina
- Entity: Republika Srpska
- Municipality: Sokolac
- Time zone: UTC+1 (CET)
  - Summer (DST): UTC+2 (CEST)

Vrapci (Serbian Cyrillic: Врапци) is a village in the municipality of Sokolac, Bosnia and Herzegovina.

== Notable people ==
- Halid Bešlić, Bosnian folk singer
