= Žulj, Bosnia and Herzegovina =

Žulj
- Village
- Interactive map of Žulj
- Location within Bosnia and Herzegovina
- Coordinates: 43°59′46″N 18°43′33″E
- Country: Bosnia and Herzegovina
- Entity: Republika Srpska
- Municipality: Sokolac

Population (1991)
  - Total: 75
- Time zone: UTC+1 (CET)
  - Summer (DST): UTC+2 (CEST)

Žulj (Serbian: Жуљ) is a village in the municipality of Sokolac, Bosnia and Herzegovina. In 1991 it had a population of 75 people.
