= Novoselci, Bosnia and Herzegovina =

Novoselci
- Village
- Location within Bosnia and Herzegovina
- Coordinates: 45°10′N 16°47′E
- Country: Bosnia and Herzegovina
- Entity: Republika Srpska
- Municipality: Kozarska Dubica

Population (1991)
  - Total: 191
- Time zone: UTC+1 (CET)
  - Summer (DST): UTC+2 (CEST)

Novoselci (Serbian Cyrillic: Новоселци) is a village in the municipality of Kozarska Dubica, Republika Srpska, Bosnia and Herzegovina.

== See also ==
- Novoseoci
