= Kadića Brdo =

- Village
- Location within Bosnia and Herzegovina
- Coordinates: 44°00′11″N 18°44′08″E
- Country: Bosnia and Herzegovina
- Entity: Republika Srpska
- Municipality: Sokolac
- Time zone: UTC+1 (CET)
  - Summer (DST): UTC+2 (CEST)

Kadića Brdo (Serbian: Кадића Брдо) is a village in the municipality of Sokolac, Bosnia and Herzegovina.
