= Džindići, Visoko =

Džindići
- Village
- Location within Bosnia and Herzegovina
- Coordinates: 44.0605114°N 18.0567265°E
- Country: Bosnia and Herzegovina
- Entity: Federation of Bosnia and Herzegovina
- Canton: Zenica-Doboj
- Municipality: Visoko

Area
  - Total: 1.55 sq mi (4.01 km^{2})

Population (2013)
  - Total: 173
  - Density: 112/sq mi (43.1/km^{2})
- Time zone: UTC+1 (CET)
  - Summer (DST): UTC+2 (CEST)

Džindići is a village in the municipality of Visoko, Bosnia and Herzegovina.

== Demographics ==
According to the 2013 census, its population was 173, all Bosniaks.
