= Žulj (surname) =

Žulj is a surname. Notable people with the surname include:

- Peter Žulj (born 1993), Austrian footballer
- Robert Žulj (born 1992), Austrian footballer, brother of Peter
