= Novoseoci =

Novoseoci Новосеоци
- Village
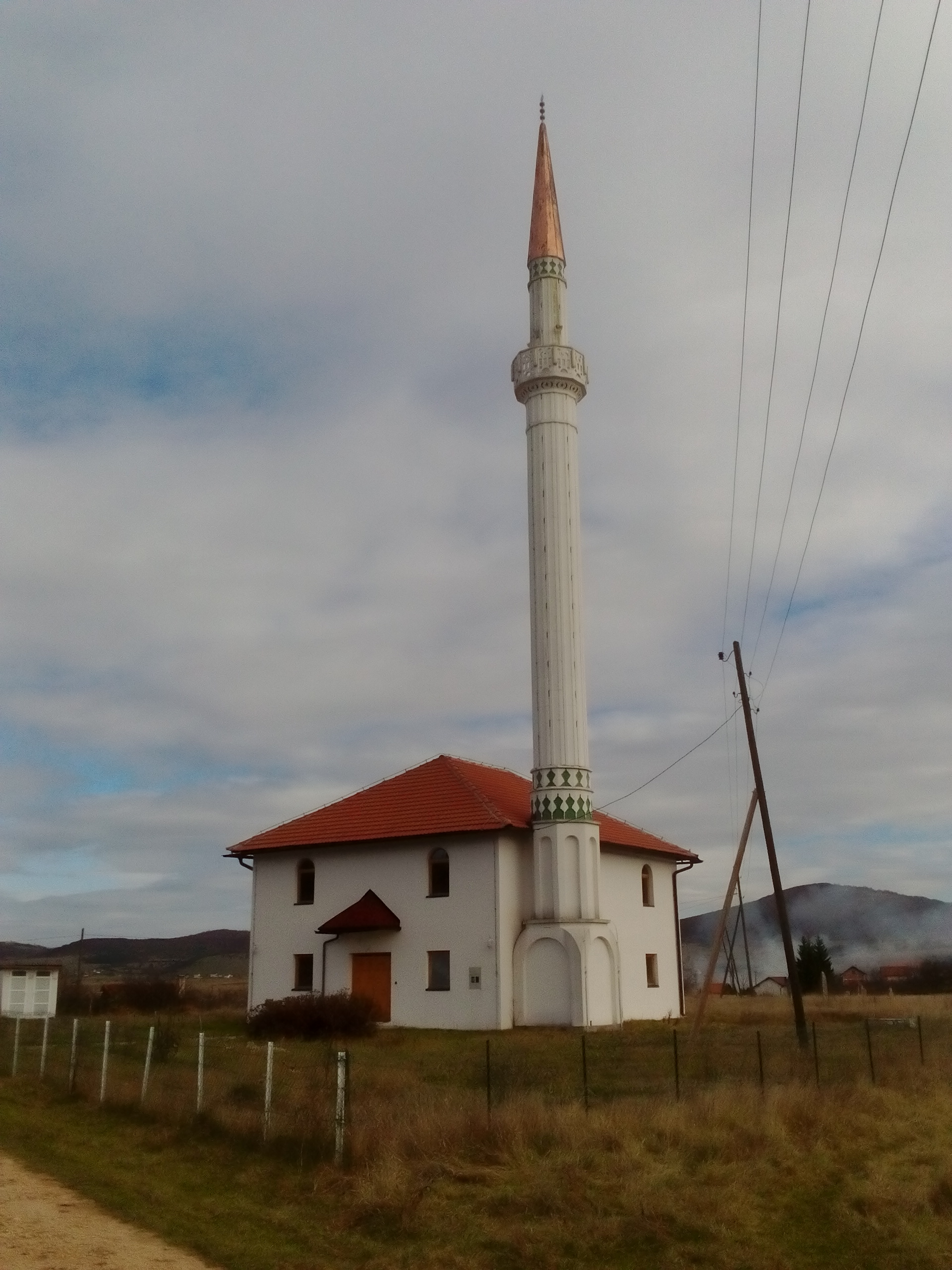
- Mosque in Novoseoci

- Location within Bosnia and Herzegovina
- Coordinates: 43°52′47″N 18°47′35″E
- Country: Bosnia and Herzegovina
- Entity: Republika Srpska
- Municipality: Sokolac

Population (2013)
  - Total: 117
- Time zone: UTC+1 (CET)
  - Summer (DST): UTC+2 (CEST)

Novoseoci (Serbian Cyrillic: Новосеоци) is a village in the municipality of Sokolac, Bosnia and Herzegovina with cold and temperate climate.

The settlement's population is completely Bosniak and is mainly engaged in animal breeding and agriculture. Before the Bosnian War, the settlement was compact with about 40 houses.

== History ==
=== Bosnian War ===
The mosque that was built in 1989 was destroyed on September 22, 1992, when the 2nd Romanian Brigade of the Army of Republika Srpska massacred 45 civilians of this settlement and its surroundings.

=== Post-war period ===
The mosque was rebuilt in 2007, and few residents returned to Novoseoci.

== See also ==
- Novoselci
