= Donja Vinča =

Donja Vinča Доња Винча
- Village
- Location within Bosnia and Herzegovina
- Coordinates: 43°46′28″N 18°48′44″E
- Country: Bosnia and Herzegovina
- Entity: Federation of Bosnia and Herzegovina
- Region Canton: East Sarajevo; Bosnian-Podrinje Goražde
- Municipality: Pale; Pale-Prača

Area
  - Total: 0.64 sq mi (1.66 km^{2})

Population (2013)
  - Total: 13
  - Density: 20/sq mi (7.8/km^{2})
- Time zone: UTC+1 (CET)
  - Summer (DST): UTC+2 (CEST)

Donja Vinča (Serbian Cyrillic: Доња Винча) is a village in the municipalities of Pale, Republika Srpska and Pale-Prača, Bosnia and Herzegovina.

== Demographics ==
According to the 2013 census, its population was 13, all Bosniaks living in the Republika Srpska part thus none in the Pale-Prača part.
