= Sokolac, Bosnia and Herzegovina =

Sokolac Соколац
- Town and municipality
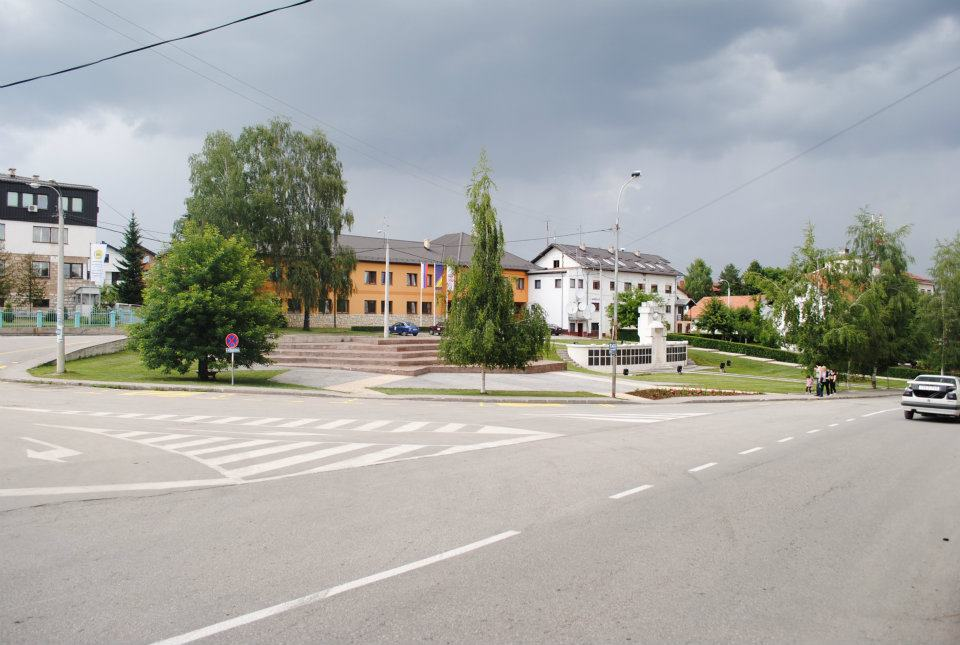

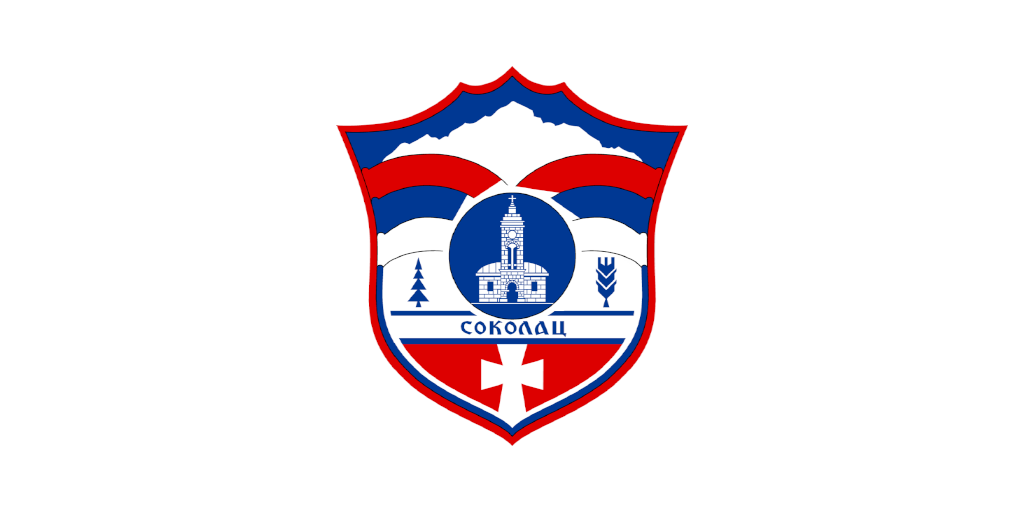
- Flag

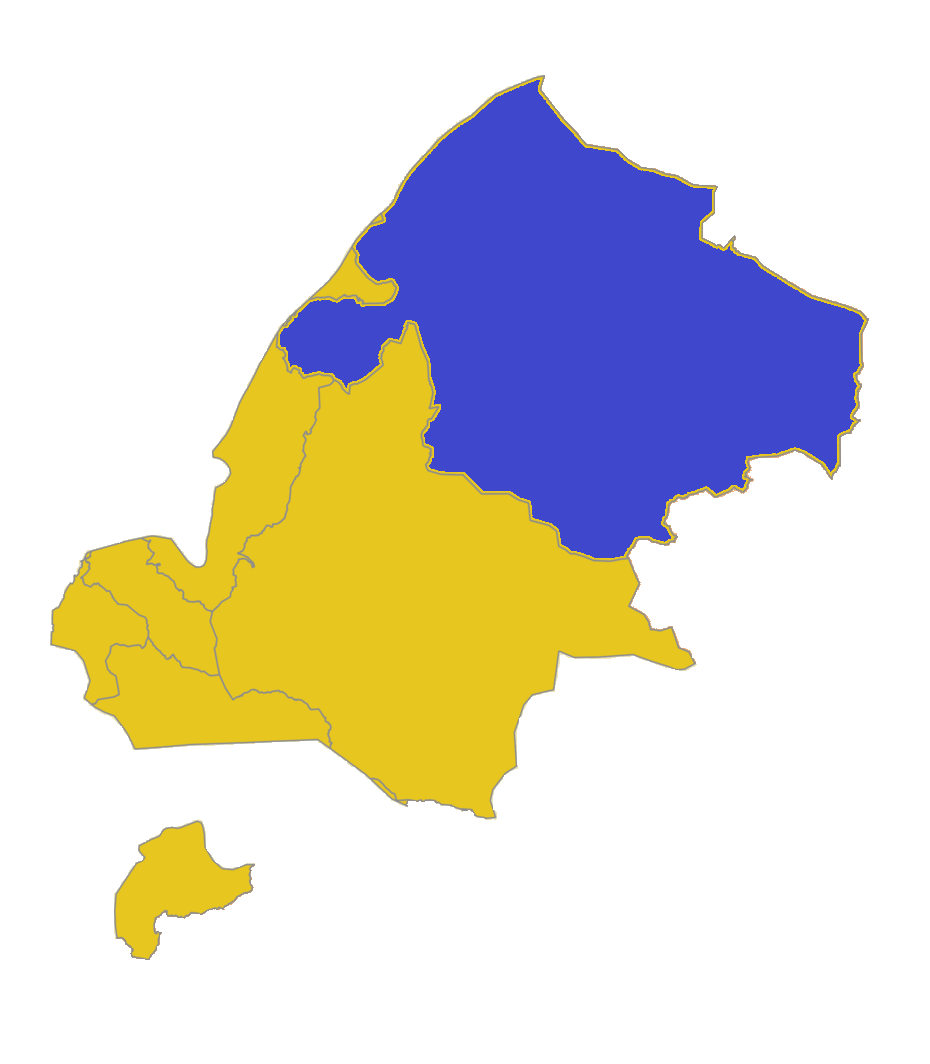
- Location of Sokolac within the city of Istočno Sarajevo
- Coordinates: 43°56′10″N 18°47′52″E
- Country: Bosnia and Herzegovina
- Entity: Republika Srpska
- City: Istočno Sarajevo
- Status: Suburban

Government
  - Municipal mayor: Strahinja Bašević (SNSD)

Area
  - Total: 693.45 km^{2} (267.74 sq mi)

Population (2013 census)
  - Total: 12,021
  - Density: 17.335/km^{2} (44.898/sq mi)
- Time zone: UTC+1 (CET)
  - Summer (DST): UTC+2 (CEST)
- Postal code: 71350
- Area code: +387 57

Sokolac (Serbian Cyrillic: Соколац) is a town and municipality of the city of Istočno Sarajevo, Republika Srpska, Bosnia and Herzegovina. As of 2013, it has a population of 12,021 inhabitants, while the town of Sokolac has a population of 5,919 inhabitants.

== Demographics ==
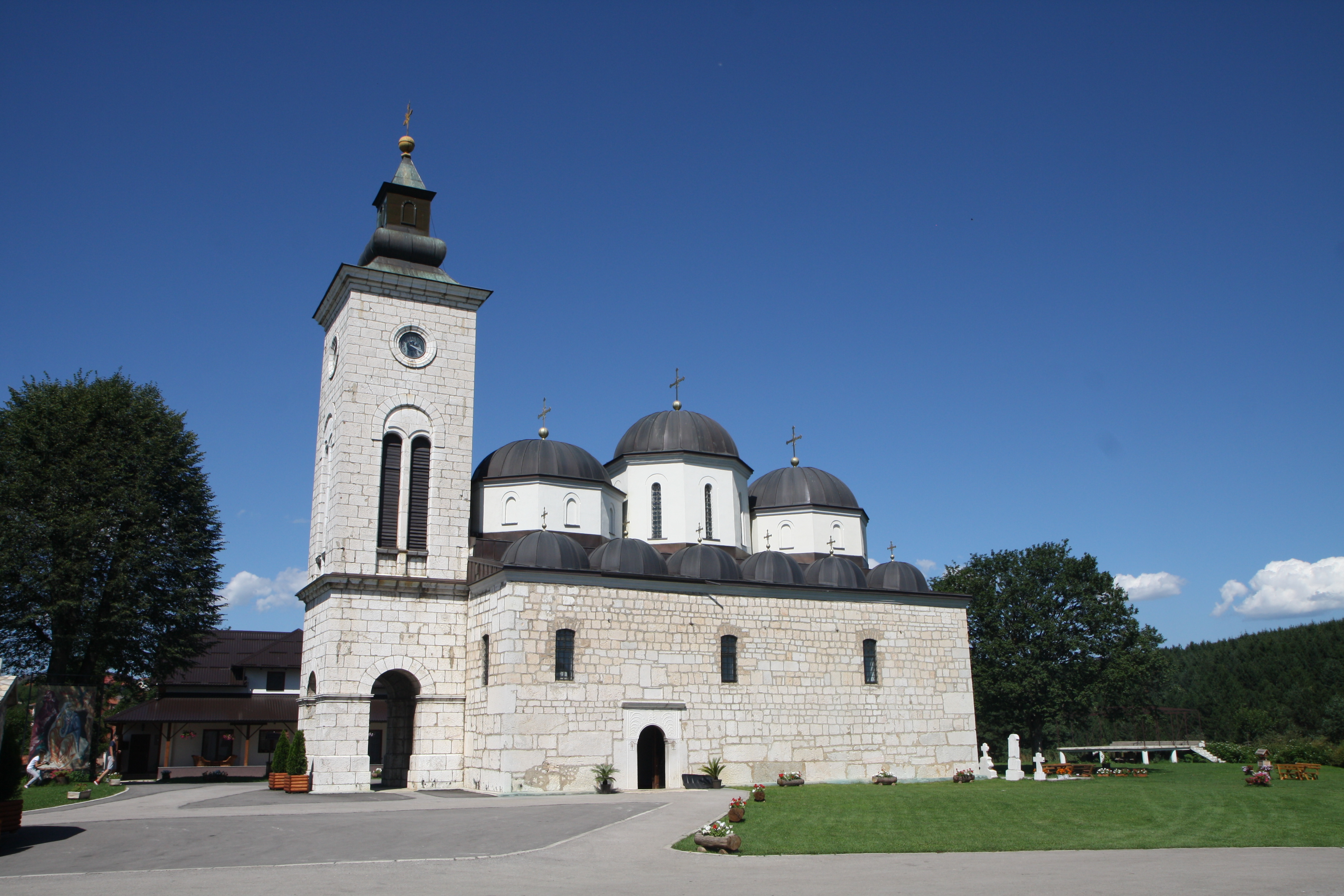
Serbian Orthodox Church of St. Elijah

=== Population ===
Population of settlements – Sokolac municipality
	Settlement	1961.	1971.	1981.	1991.	2013.
	Total		17,053	15,281	14,833	12,021
1	Baltići				185	403
2	Brejakovići				153	218
3	Knežina				465	237
4	Novo Selo				119	693
5	Podromanija				377	1,268
6	Ravna Romanija				115	237
7	Sokolac	1,132	2,464	3,649	5,562	5,919
8	Vidrići				243	257

=== Ethnic composition ===
Ethnic composition – Sokolac town
	2013.	1991.	1981.	1971.
Total	5,919 (100,0%)	5,562 (100,0%)	3,649 (100,0%)	2,464 (100,0%)
Serbs		5,182 (93,17%)	3,211 (88,00%)	2,256 (91,56%)
Bosniaks		262 (4,711%)	140 (3,837%)	107 (4,343%)
Others		61 (1,097%)	5 (0,137%)	8 (0,325%)
Yugoslavs		47 (0,845%)	224 (6,139%)	16 (0,649%)
Croats		10 (0,180%)	34 (0,932%)	43 (1,745%)
Montenegrins			29 (0,795%)	30 (1,218%)
Albanians			5 (0,137%)	3 (0,122%)
Macedonians			1 (0,027%)	
Hungarians				1 (0,041%)

Ethnic composition – Sokolac municipality
	2013.	1991.	1981.	1971.
Total	12,021 (100,0%)	14,883 (100,0%)	15,281 (100,0%)	17,053 (100,0%)
Serbs	11,250 (93,59%)	10,195 (68,50%)	9,743 (63,76%)	11,006 (64,54%)
Bosniaks	671 (5,582%)	4,493 (30,19%)	4,817 (31,52%)	5,790 (33,95%)
Others	71 (0,591%)	93 (0,625%)	123 (0,805%)	47 (0,276%)
Croats	29 (0,241%)	19 (0,128%)	57 (0,373%)	128 (0,751%)
Yugoslavs		83 (0,558%)	486 (3,180%)	23 (0,135%)
Montenegrins			42 (0,275%)	53 (0,311%)
Macedonians			6 (0,039%)	1 (0,006%)
Albanians			5 (0,033%)	3 (0,018%)
Slovenes			1 (0,007%)	
Hungarians			1 (0,007%)	2 (0,012%)

== Economy ==
Sokolac is an important intersection for regional transport routes. The roads that intersect in Sokolac are between Sarajevo and the Adriatic Sea, Belgrade, Užice, Banja Luka and Bijeljina.

Economic preview

The following table gives a preview of total number of registered people employed in legal entities per their core activity (as of 2018):

Activity	Total
Agriculture, forestry and fishing	525
Mining and quarrying	-
Manufacturing	392
Electricity, gas, steam and air conditioning supply	54
Water supply; sewerage, waste management and remediation activities	-
Construction	360
Wholesale and retail trade, repair of motor vehicles and motorcycles	373
Transportation and storage	90
Accommodation and food services	70
Information and communication	23
Financial and insurance activities	31
Real estate activities	-
Professional, scientific and technical activities	28
Administrative and support service activities	10
Public administration and defense; compulsory social security	252
Education	173
Human health and social work activities	305
Arts, entertainment and recreation	22
Other service activities	22
Total	2,730

== Sport ==
The local OFK Glasinac 2011's predecessor club FK Glasinac Sokolac has played two seasons in the country's top level Premier League of Bosnia and Herzegovina. They now play in the third tier.

== Climate ==
Climate data for Sokolac (1991–2020)
Month	Jan	Feb	Mar	Apr	May	Jun	Jul	Aug	Sep	Oct	Nov	Dec	Year
Record high °C (°F)	16.9 (62.4)	20.2 (68.4)	24.4 (75.9)	27.9 (82.2)	30.6 (87.1)	33.4 (92.1)	36.1 (97.0)	36.0 (96.8)	34.5 (94.1)	28.3 (82.9)	25.5 (77.9)	16.3 (61.3)	36.1 (97.0)
Mean daily maximum °C (°F)	3.0 (37.4)	5.2 (41.4)	9.2 (48.6)	13.9 (57.0)	18.7 (65.7)	22.8 (73.0)	25.0 (77.0)	25.4 (77.7)	20.1 (68.2)	15.7 (60.3)	9.5 (49.1)	3.3 (37.9)	14.3 (57.7)
Daily mean °C (°F)	−2.7 (27.1)	−1.1 (30.0)	2.7 (36.9)	7.3 (45.1)	12.1 (53.8)	16.0 (60.8)	17.7 (63.9)	17.5 (63.5)	12.7 (54.9)	8.3 (46.9)	3.4 (38.1)	−1.6 (29.1)	7.7 (45.9)
Mean daily minimum °C (°F)	−7.4 (18.7)	−6.4 (20.5)	−2.7 (27.1)	1.3 (34.3)	5.6 (42.1)	9.0 (48.2)	10.4 (50.7)	10.3 (50.5)	6.5 (43.7)	2.4 (36.3)	−1.2 (29.8)	−5.6 (21.9)	1.9 (35.4)
Record low °C (°F)	−31.6 (−24.9)	−29.4 (−20.9)	−26.0 (−14.8)	−12.3 (9.9)	−4.3 (24.3)	−2.9 (26.8)	0.7 (33.3)	0.6 (33.1)	−6.3 (20.7)	−17.2 (1.0)	−21.0 (−5.8)	−25.6 (−14.1)	−31.6 (−24.9)
Average precipitation mm (inches)	57.3 (2.26)	58.4 (2.30)	58.3 (2.30)	72.6 (2.86)	89.5 (3.52)	97.9 (3.85)	83.7 (3.30)	68.8 (2.71)	84.2 (3.31)	90.0 (3.54)	81.1 (3.19)	74.0 (2.91)	915.8 (36.06)
Average precipitation days (≥ 1.0 mm)	9.3	9.4	9.0	10.7	10.7	11.0	8.9	7.4	8.7	8.9	8.5	9.7	112.1
Source: NOAA

== International cooperation ==
List of Sokolac's sister and twin cities:

- (Germany) Hohenburg
- (Greece) Ormylia
- (Serbia) Arilje
- (Kosovo) Goraždevac
- (Serbia) Obrenovac

Friendship agreement:

- (Montenegro) Nikšić

== Notable person ==
- Hilmo Selimović, businessperson
- Halid Bešlić, singer

== See also ==
- Municipalities of Republika Srpska
