= Osat =

Region in central Podrinje in Bosnia & Herzegovina

Coordinates: 44.0667°N 19.3981°E

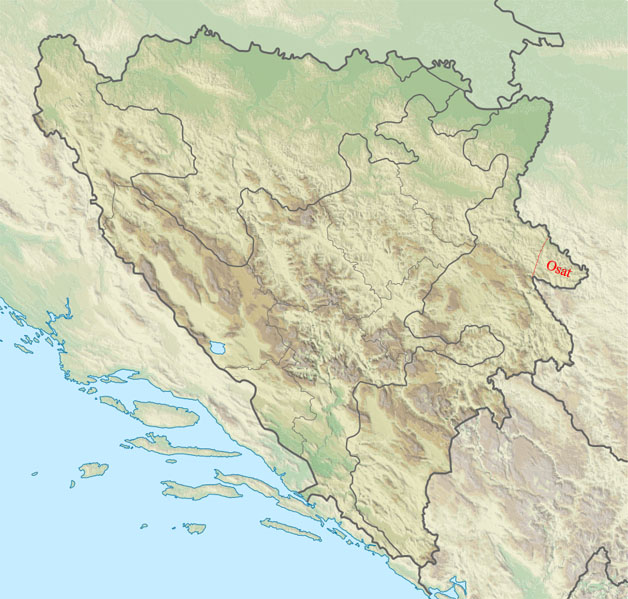
Location map of Osat.

Osat (Serbian Cyrillic: Осат) is a region in central Podrinje (left of the Drina), in Bosnia and Herzegovina. It is situated between the towns of Višegrad and Srebrenica, and includes parts of the municipalities of Bratunac and Srebrenica. It is part of the wider Birač region.

Villages in the region, according to teacher Vasilije Stefanović, writing in 1860, included: Blažijevići, Boljevići, Božići, Bujakovići, Crvica, Jaketići, Karina, Kalimanići, Kostolomci, Krnjići, Mlečva, Mošići, Osatica, Petriča, Postolje, Pribidol Srpski, Pribidol Turski, Radoševići, Ratkovići, Stanatovići, Tegare, Toplica, Vraneševići, Vucare, Žabokvica Srpska, Žabokvica Turska, Žlijebac.

== History ==
Osat was a župa (county) in the Middle Ages. It was part of the Serbian Despotate (1402–1459). It was subsequently conquered by the Ottoman Empire, and later administratively organized into the Sanjak of Zvornik.

The area of Osat was liberated for a short time during the First Serbian Uprising (1804–13), under the leadership of Kara-Marko Vasić from Crvica. Upon the breakout of the uprising, Metropolitan Hadži Melentije Stevanović contacted Vasić, who met with the rebel leadership. After participated in battles on the Drina (1804), Vasić asked Karađorđe for an army to liberate Osat; Lazar Mutap was dispatched and the region came under rebel rule. In 1808, the Ottomans cleared out Osat, and by 1813, the rebels left the region. In the inter-war period, the population was divided between Orthodox and Muslim, with the Orthodox males commonly working as builders in Bosnia and Serbia. They were differentiated by their neighbours through their traditional costumes and some traditions.

== Sources ==
- Cvetko Stojkanović (2009). Sto godina crkve u Crvici i razvoj duhovnog života u Osatu. Bajina Bašta: Stefan Co Arsenijević. ISBN 978-86-88031-01-1.
