= Battles of Podrinje (1807) =

1807 battle from First Serbian Uprising

- Part of First Serbian Uprising
- Location: Sanjak of Zvornik, Ottoman Empire
- Commanded by: Jakov Nenadović, Luka Lazarević, Stojan Čupić; Ali Bey Vidajić, Ismail Pasha and Hadji Sali Bey
- Objective: Expansion of rebellion into Bosnia.; Securing Podrinje, suppression of rebellion in Bosnia.
- Date: March–December 1807
- Executed by: Valjevo and Šabac nahija army; Bosnia Eyalet army detachments
- Outcome: Serbian Podrinje in rebel hands; Suppression of rebellion in Bosnia

The Battles of Podrinje were fought in 1807 by the Drina river between the Serbian rebels under the command of Jakov Nenadović, Luka Lazarević, Stojan Čupić and Petar Moler and Ottoman Bosnian army under the command of Ali Bey Vidajić, Ismail Pasha and Hadji Sali Bey.

== Background ==
Following the Serbian takeover of Belgrade and Šabac, the Serbian rebels sought to take over the territories on the right side of the Drina (Serbian Podrinje) that were under the administration of the Sanjak of Zvornik. The Serbian rebel leadership sent vojvoda (general) Jakov Nenadović of the Valjevo nahija and priest Luka Lazarević of the Šabac nahija to Podrinje in late February 1807 to push out the Ottomans and unite the area with Revolutionary Serbia.

== History ==
=== Loznica, Lipnica, Lešnica, Krupanj ===
The Serbian rebel army under Jakov and Luka crossed the Cer mountain and entered Serbian Podrinje (Jadar and Rađevina). Anta Bogićević, the Serb starešina (leader) in Podrinje, met with the rebels at Badanja, having with him 800 men. The "Turks" in the area had heard that the Serbian rebels set out to take the area and had asked Anta to inform them when, as they would voluntarily leave for Bosnia ahead of the rebel arrival. Jakov approved, and Anta discussed conditions with the Turks, who left Loznica on 13–14 March [O.S. 1–2 March] 1807. The Serbian rebel army entered Loznica on 14 March, on Theodore's Saturday, and organized the city. After Loznica, the rest of the Muslim-inhabited towns, Turska Lipnica, Lešnica and Krupanj, also voluntarily left for Bosnia. The only remaining Turk settlements on the right side of the Drina towards rebel territory were Soko and villages surrounding it. Anta Bogićević was appointed the vojvoda of Podrinje.

=== Organization of Serbian Podrinje ===
Anta mustered and organized the rebel army of Serbian Podrinje, and as the main commander and governor of Podrinje, had a military cordon line stretching from the Žiča river to Soko in which he strengthened the defense towards Ottoman Bosnia. In light of Ottoman Bosnian incursions, supreme leader Karađorđe stayed for a short period and instructed and advised Anta on fortification and defense, arriving at Loznica and with Anta inspected the Podrinje region where šanac (also šarampov, sconce or schanze) were to be set up. At Loznica, a double šanac in the town was built surrounded by sconces on three surrounding hills, it was a large moat (opkop) located where the later church was built, that the rebels called "the fortress" (grad). Sconces or moats were present or were now built at the Tičar field by the Drina, the Jadar river island, Rožanj hill towards Soko, Baurić, and several by the Drina, and shortly after also at Jarebice above Loznica, at the height of Kostajnik, and the Jagodnja hill. Petar Moler had many sconces built in the Soko nahija.

In 1807, the following sconces existed in the area:
- Delidržac, on Rožanj hill (973m), command-administrative sconce, built on the order of vojvoda Jakov in 1807. A camp of the Valjevo nahija army.
- Baurić, on Baurić hill (797m), command-administrative sconce, built by Petar Moler in 1806. Overlooked the Drina–Ljubovija valley. Seat of the Soko nahija.
- Mrčko, on Mrčko hill above the Mrčanica river near Pecka, command-administrative sconce, built by Petar Moler in 1806 on the site of an Austrian watchtower crewed by the Serbian Militia (1718–46).
- Lower Rožanj and Rožanj III, below Delidržac, two nearby siege/blockade sconces built by Austrian military in the 1789 siege of Soko, renovated by rebels in 1805.
- Petkov vis (954m), above Laze village, siege/blockade sconce built in 1807.
- Kozle, above river and village Kozle, siege/blockade sconce on a road to Soko, built in 1807.
- Peći, above Peći village, siege/blockade sconce on the Gorice–Peći road built in 1807.
- Mala, above former Mala village, below Kutanj hill (600m), siege/blockade sconce rebuilt in 1807, used by Austrian military in the 1789 siege of Soko for battery that bombarded the city.
- Laze, in Laze village on Vranjača hill, siege/blockade sconce built by Jakov in 1805, likely on a 1789 Austrian sconce.
- Krupanj, incursion-prevention sconce, built by Krsta Ignjatović in 1805.
- Grad hill/Stone sconce (Kameni šanac), on Jagodnja I (822m), incursion-prevention sconce, built in 1807, located at the crossroads of Mačkov kamen–Soko and Gračanica–Krupanj. Encased with stone.
- Šanac hill (830m), on Jagodnja II, incursion-prevention sconce, built in 1807, controlling the Mačkov kamen–Soko road and Krupanj road.
- Perunica hill, on Jagodnja III (918m), incursion-prevention sconce, built in 1807, located on the Drina–Mačkov kamen road.
- Kučevci, incursion-prevention sconce, built in 1807, located at confluence of Gračanica into Drina.
- Postenje, incursion-prevention moat (šarampov), built in 1807.
- Tepavac in Uzovnica on the Ilino brdo hill (390m), incursion-prevention sconce, located above Muslim village of Tepavac, controlling the main Drina road and the road to Jagodnja.
- Sikirić in Vrhpolje on the Drina bank, incursion-prevention sconce, protecting skela (ferry) and transit.
- Proslop mountain pass, incursion-prevention sconce, built in 1805.
- Kostajnik, incursion-prevention sconce, built in 1807, controlling Loznica–Krupanj road.
- Cerik–Rađevo polje in Bela Crkva, incursion-prevention moat (šarampov), built in 1807, controlling roads from Soko, Šabac, Valjevo and Loznica.
- Bratačić on Kik hill (459m), below Kokorovina, incursion-prevention moat (šarampov), built in 1806.

=== Expansion to Bosnia ===
Karađorđe wanted to expand the uprising to Bosnia, Old Serbia and Herzegovina. On 14 April 1807, Jakov and Luka were ordered by Karađorđe to expand the rebellion to Bosnia. With the Valjevo and Šabac armies, they were to cross the Drina and "burn and rise all of Bosnia". Metropolitan Leontius wrote to Wallachian prince Ypsilantis that among Jakov's men, some were already in Bosnia where they armed the people. Karađorđe himself went with an army and cannons on Višegrad, while Stojan Čupić went and burnt Janja and Bijeljina, to rise up the region. French consul at Travnik wrote to Paris that the Serbian rebels were 3–4 days from Travnik. The Serbian rebels entered Bosnia from two directions and where joined by local Orthodox. Bijeljina was besieged, but the rebels there were pushed back by Ali Bey Vidajić. As a punishment, in April 1807 Vidajić's men burnt down the Tavna Monastery and four Serb villages on the Drina: Banjica, Poljice, Bjeloševac and Glavičice. In early May, some captured rebels on the Drina had flyers that called for rebellion in Bosnia. Karađorđe had been forced to leave the Bosnian front as the Russian military alliance was to begin and Mula Pasha from Vidin invaded Negotinska Krajina. Jakov and Luka had little success, and were pushed back and pursued into Serbian Podrinje from where they fought tirelessly to kick out the Bosnian army.

There was unrest in Bosnian Posavina, while Vizier Mehmed Pasha was away from Bosnia. On Đurđevdan (St. George's Day), 6 May, an army led by priest Smiljanić had crossed the Drina and went as far as Tuzla. Zvornik was the "key to Bosnia", and losing it to the rebels would put Sarajevo and Travnik in danger. In late May, the Ottoman Bosnian army stopped a Serbian breakthrough on Zvornik, while a larger rebel unit crossed to the south, towards Vlasenica.

In the beginning of July, Mehmed Pasha sent two strong detachments of the Bosnia Eyalet army into Serbia, the first numbering 4,000 under Ali Bey Vidajić via Zvornik, the second 1,200 under Ismail Pasha near Bijeljina. The Negotin Assembly held on 10 July decided that operations in Bosnia be stopped, while continuing to defend from Bosnian incursions. Užice was handed over to the Serbs on 11 July, after a three-month siege by vojvoda Milan Obrenović, and its Muslim population was escorted safely by the Serbs to Bosnia. At the end of September, Vidajić crossed between Janja and Zvornik and burnt down numerous Serb villages and took great loot. A Russian–Ottoman peace treaty was signed that stretched from September 1807 to 1 April 1808; the Bosnian Vizier sought that the ceasefire also include the Serbian rebels. There were false news in Dalmatian newspapers that the Serbian rebels had arrived outside Sarajevo in early October.

At the end of October 1807, 500 men of Petar Moler by the Drina were decimated by 17,000 troops under Ismail Pasha Sanulo and Hadji Sali Bey, who utilized an Orthodox feast day when these were drunk and sleepy. At the beginning of November, the rebels retaliated by burning down numerous Muslim villages and looting, killing, alarming Sarajevo and seeking once again to rise up Bosnia. 1,200 Serb families were brought with the rebels from Bosnia into Serbia. Mehmed Pasha ordered a new attack on Serbia on 5 November 1807.

In December 1807, a Russian news article claimed that Karađorđe, "leader of rebels of Serbia and Bosnia", set out to take Sarajevo, and this rebel action was also mentioned by the London Times. That same month, Austria prohibited the export of lead, which forced the rebels to manufacture it and cannons themselves.

== Aftermath ==
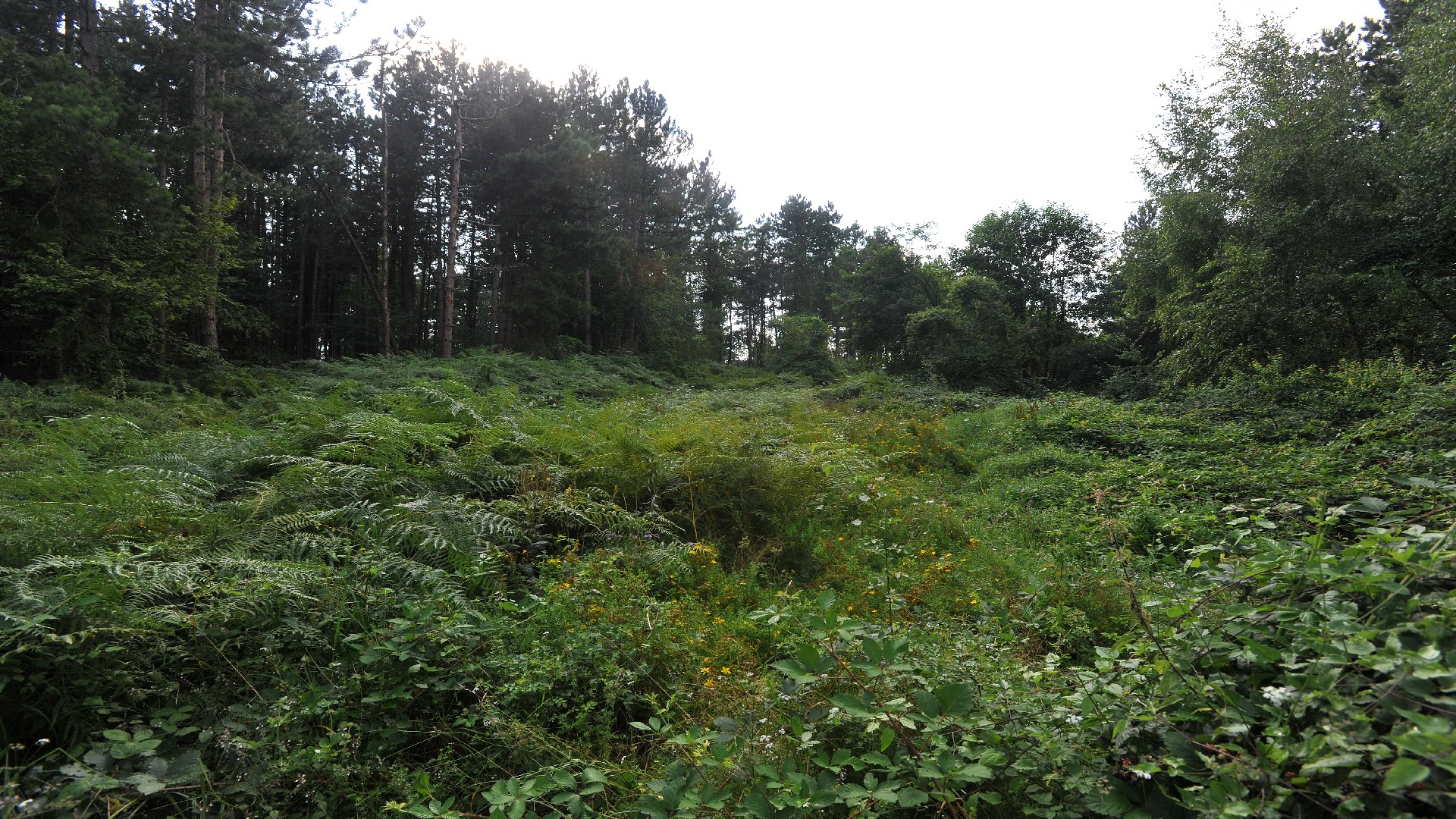
Overgrown šanac of Baurić.

A rebel army of 12,000 infantry and 6,000 cavalry were stationed near Užice at the beginning of 1808. It threatened the Bosnia Eyalet with invasions over the Drina. A rebel attack was believed to have been planned to be carried out via Serb-inhabited Nova Varoš and Višegrad, and another on Bijeljina.

== See also ==
- Timeline of the Serbian Revolution
- Serbian Army (revolutionary)

== Annotations ==
1. The events are known in historiography as "Serb-Turk warfare on the Drina", "actions in Drina" (akcije na Drini), "takeover of Podrinje" (zauzeće Podrinja), etc.

== Sources ==
- Obradović, Stojan (1873). Живот и радња заслужних Срба из окружија шабачког и подринског у књажеству Србији у устанцима противу насиља турског од 1804. и 1815. године: у два одељка. Stefanović.
- Protić, Kosta (1893). "Ратни догађаји из првога српског устанка под Карађорђем Петровићем 1804—1813". Годишњица Николе Чупића. XIII. Državna štamparija.
- Ristanović, Slobodan (1971). Ustanička Rađevina: prilozi za hroniku. Istorijski arhiv.
- Stojančević, Vladimir (2004). Србија и српски народ у време првог устанка [Serbia and the Serb people in the time of the First Uprising]. Матица српска. ISBN 978-86-83651-41-2.
- Teinović, Bratislav (2020). "Преглед српско-турског ратовања на Дрини (1804-1815)" (PDF). Војноисторијски гласник. 2. Институт за стратегијска истраживања: 9–35.
- Vasiljević, Milivoje (2001). Соко - Град [Soko - Fortress]. Јанус.
