= Kara-Marko =

Serbian revolutionary

- Born: Crvica, Sanjak of Zvornik, Ottoman Empire
- Died: 1815; Revolutionary Serbia
- Cause of death: Assassination
- Burial place: Grabovac near Valjevo (1845)
- Military career
- Allegiance: Revolutionary Serbia
- Service years: 1804–
- Rank: harambaša, buljubaša, vojvoda
- Nickname: Kara-Marko
- Units: Valjevo nahija army; Soko nahija army
- Commands: Podrinje
- Known for: commander in Soko nahija and Drina frontier

Marko Vasić (Serbian: Марко Васић), known as Kara-Marko (Кара-Марко) was a Serb revolutionary, active in the First Serbian Uprising (1804–1813), notably in the Podrinje (Drina river) region. He was a hajduk who was elevated to vojvoda (general) of Rača in 1810 by supreme leader Karađorđe

== Life and career ==
Marko Vasić was born into a large zadruga (patriarchal extended family) in the Gručići hamlet in the village of Crvica, in the Osat region of the Sanjak of Zvornik in the Bosnia Eyalet. According to another account, he was born in Mlečva, also in Osat. Osat was a Serb-inhabited area by the Drina river (on the left, Bosnian side), that in the 1800s was part of the land tenure held by Hadji Sali Bey of Srebrenica, who also held Azbukovica by the Drina (on the right, Serbian side). Vasić was a blacksmith by trade. He was physically strong, athletic and energetic, known as courageous and a marksman. He became a hajduk (brigand) and rose to become a harambaša (hajduk leader). He had a characteristic large dark spot on his face. The Srebrenica Turks feared him and often travelled around Crvica due to this.

When the uprising against the Dahije reached the Soko nahiya, he joined the uprising. During the uprising he had a house in Valjevo. In early 1805, Karađorđe recommended vojvoda (general) Jakov Nenadović to take Soko and Užice and to rise up all of the Soko, Užice and Zvornik nahiyas. Jakov called the archimandrite of Rača and rebel leader Hadži-Melentije Stevanović (who also was from Osat), who had risen and armed part of the Soko nahiya, Milan Obrenović with the Rudnik nahija army, and captain Radič Petrović to aid him in the capture of Užice, to begin with. Jakov's Valjevo army liberated the areas of Ljubovija, Baurić, Bačevci, Dona, Rogačica, Pljeskovo and Rača. The Valjevo army was accompanied by Hadži-Melentije and Vasić who led rebels of the Rača area. The Valjevo army was then joined by Aleksa Popović from Subjel. At the end of July, Ottoman Bosnian troops from Zvornik failed in a general attack on the rebels. Some 2,000 troops of the Zvornik group were stationed towards Užice. Hadži-Melentije was a commander in the takeover of Užice, and Karađorđe appointed him the starešina (governor) of the Soko nahiya, and he later received the vojvoda rank. Vasić participated in the takeover of Užice.

Vasić upheld communications with Hadži-Melentije and other notables of Soko and Valjevo nahiyas and prepared Osat for rebellion. Hadži-Melentije knew of Vasić's abilities and called upon him. Kara-Marko was the leader of Bosnian Serb hajduks, and he rallied the Orthodox against the Muslims of Srebrenica. In February 1806, Kara-Marko defeated Hasan Pasha of Srebrenica with the coordination of vojvoda (general) Milan Obrenović. This eased Karađorđe's burning of many Podrinje cities and settlements by the end of March 1806. In the battles on the Drina, Vasić distinguished himself through courage and fearlessness that became known even in Šumadija. Hearing of him, Karađorđe ordered that he report, and when meeting Vasić, he gave him the nickname Kara-Marko. Kara-Marko asked for an army, and Karađorđe lent him vojvoda (general) Lazar Mutap to attack Srebrenica and liberate Osat. Kara-Marko's first attack failed, and he retreated with his men to Serbian Podrinje. His wife was killed during that retreat while crossing the Drina by boat, near Skelani.

Kara-Marko participated in all notable battles on the Drina, fighting alongside Hadži-Melentije. He strengthened positions at Rača, Bačevci, Petriča and Perućac towards Bosnia. In early 1806 the Travnik Vizier Mehmed Pasha was ordered to support the Belgrade Vizier against the Serbian rebels and return Podrinje and Soko to Ottoman administration. Mehmed Pasha and Sinan Pasha took control of Užice, Podrinje and Soko. On 29 September 1807, Hasan Pasha of Srebrenica and Hadji Sali Bey crossed the Drina at Sikirić in Osat where they pushed out Serbian rebels from three trenches. Among these were Hadži-Melentije and Kara-Marko, and they lost over 40 men and one monk. The Serbian rebel army now mustered to support Podrinje and included also the Russian captain Ilija Novokršteni, who came up with a tactic for the 12,000-strong army that succeeded, with many Ottoman casualties and great loot. Several hundred families resettled in Serbia. Russian deputy Rodofinikin informed Prozorovsky about the victory on the Drina and in Osat in a letter dated 20 October 1807 and suggested that Matija, Hadži-Melentije and Karađorđe receive specific decorations (which they all received in 1810).

The new Travnik Vizier Ibrahim Pasha was ordered by the new sultan to break through Podrinje towards Užice in early 1808, and with Hasan Pasha of Srebrenica the Ottoman Bosnian army crossed the Drina at Bukovica and began burning down Serb villages in Podrinje and take slaves. The Podrinje rebels were eventually aided by Milan Obrenović. On Lučindan (St. Luke's Day) the 13,000-strong Bosnian army clashed with the 15,000-strong rebel army led by Milan Obrenović, Jakov Nenadović, Sima Birčanin, Hadži-Melentije and Kara-Marko at Oklenac and Vranjkovina in Osat. Osat was devastated and 66 Serbs were captured at Crvica, used by Hasan Pasha as human shields. Kara-Marko led a strong assault via Rača and Skelani which freed the prisoners and pushed Hasan Pasha towards Srebrenica. A battle was fought in Pribićevac. Luka Lazarević mentioned him in his memoirs, regarding fights in Osat and Srebrenica in 1809: "Karamarko expels the Turks, and rises the [Orthodox] Christians against them".

After Hadži-Melentije left for the Russian Empire in 1810, Karađorđe appointed Kara-Marko the vojvoda (general) of the Soko nahija (district) and a military senior (starešina) in Rača. He fought heroically in the Podrinje region, and for his courage, he was elevated to vojvoda. He was based at the Baurić trench. At this time, his clerk was Nićifor Ninković, and his buljubaše (captains) were Petar and Janko. After an intrigue, Karađorđe had him removed on 7 April 1813, after which he worked with Matija Nenadović in Valjevo. In May 1813 he gathered an army and crossed into Osat to defend it from the Ottomans. He was one of few that did not flee to the Habsburg monarchy after the suppression of the uprising. He settled a village near Topola and became a hajduk (brigand).

Due to his loyalty to Karađorđe, the new Serbian leader Miloš Obrenović ordered his murder and had his severed head given to the Vizier of Belgrade. The rest of his body were brought by his descendants to the church in Grabovac near Valjevo to be buried in the porta in 1845. He had received many wounds while fighting in Podrinje, and was described as very heroic, famed, and a good singer. He was included in an epic poem in Sarajlija's Srbijanka.

He attained legendary fame in Osat. His scribe Nićifor Ninković wrote about him.

== See also ==
- List of people of the First Serbian Uprising
- Luka Milovanov Georgijević (1784–1828)
- Milovan Nikolić

== Annotations ==
1. His name was Marko Vasić (Марко Васић). He was known as Kara-Marko (Кара-Марко), Karamarko (Карамарко), Marko Kara (Марко Кара) and Kara-Marković (Кара-Марковић). The demonym Osaćanin (Осаћанин) is some times used.

== Sources ==
- Batalaka, Lazar Arsenijević (1899). Историја српског устанка, део други [History of the Serbian Uprising: Part Two]. Vol. II. Izd. Batalakinoga fonda – via Google Books.
- Ignjić, Stevan (1985). Bajina Bašta i okolina: do 1941. Vol. 1. Narodna matična biblioteka. pp. 23–26.
- Milićević, Milan Đ. (1888). Поменик знаменитих људи у српског народа новијега доба. Издање Чупићеве задужбине – via Archive.org.
- Nenadović, Konstantin N. (1884). Живот и дела великог Ђорђа Петровића Кара-Ђорђа. Vol. II (1 ed.). Vienna: У Штампарији Јована Н. Вернаја – via Google Books.
- Nenadović, Matija (1893). Kovačević, Ljubomir (ed.). Мемоари Матије Ненадовића [Memoirs of Matija Nenadović]. Srpska književna zadruga.
- Teinović, Bratislav (2020). "Преглед српско-турског ратовања на Дрини (1804-1815)" (PDF). Војноисторијски гласник. 2. Институт за стратегијска истраживања: 9–35.
- Stojkanović, Cvetko (2009). Сто годину Цркве у Црвици и развој духовног живота у Осату. Bajina Bašta. ISBN 978-86-88031-01-1.
