= Skelani attack =

1993 military attack of the Bosnian War

Skelani massacre
- Part of Bosnian War
- Skelani (Bosnia and Herzegovina)
- Location: 43°58′31″N 19°32′08″E; Skelani, Bosnia and Herzegovina
- Date: 16 January 1993
- Target: Serbs
- Deaths: 40-65
- Injuries: 165
- Victim: Serbs
- Assailant: Army of the Republic of Bosnia and Herzegovina

The Skelani massacre refers to the Army of the Republic of Bosnia and Herzegovina (ARBiH) attack on Skelani, group of villages in region of Srebrenica, Bosnia and Herzegovina, held by Army of Republika Srpska (VRS), which happened on 16 January 1993. Between 40–65 Serbs were killed in the attack.

== ICTY findings ==
During Bosnian War, the Army of Republika Srpska (VRS) attacked Bosniak cities and villages in eastern Bosnia, as part of its "six strategic goals" of "eliminating the Drina river as a border" between Serbia and Bosnian Serbs. Although the Serb forces took control of Zvornik, Bratunac, and Vlasenica municipalities during the first half of 1992, pockets in the surrounding area remained outside of their reach, with Bosniaks offering resistance. The Serb forces started the siege of Srebrenica. Between April 1992 and March 1993, the Srebrenica areas were constantly subjected to Serb military assaults, including artillery attacks, sniper fire, as well as occasional bombing from aircraft.

The Bosnian Serb forces controlled the access roads and forbade international humanitarian aid to reach the Srebrenica enclave, not even allowing food and medical relief. As a consequence, there was a constant shortage of food. This starvation peaked in the winter of 1992/93.

In order to overcome this shortage, Bosnian Muslim forces occasionally raided nearby Serb villages in search for food. On 16 January 1993 soldiers of the ARBiH, allegedly led by Naser Orić, attacked the villages of Skelani.

The Bosnian Muslim forces almost reached the border with Serbia, but were stopped a kilometer within Skelani due to an intervention by the Yugoslav Army and Territorial Defense units from the Užice Corps. The Bosniak forces came so close that some were even machine-gunning Serb civilians fleeing across the border to Bajina Bašta, Serbia.

== Serbian narrative ==
Dozens of Serbs were killed in the attack. According to Serb sources numbers claimed vary between dozen to 40, or 65 killed, around a hundred wounded, while purportedly 30 people were taken prisoners and beaten, and 2 children killed, allegedly all civilians from Skelani village and its hamlets of Ćosići, Žabokvica, Toplica i Kalimanići, wider region of Srebrenica.

=== Memorial ===
In the village of Skelani in 2005 the Government of Republika Srpska erected a monument for 305 Serb victims, alleging that they were all civilians who were killed during the war (1992–1995). The monument claims that 32 children were among killed.

== Sources ==
- Central Intelligence Agency, Office of Russian and European Analysis (2002). Balkan Battlegrounds: A Military History of the Yugoslav Conflict, 1990–1995. Washington, D.C.: Central Intelligence Agency. OCLC 50396958.
- "Prosecutor vs. Radovan Karadžić – Judgement" (PDF). International Criminal Tribunal for the Former Yugoslavia. 26 March 2016.
- "Prosecutor vs. Naser Orić – Judgement" (PDF). International Criminal Tribunal for the Former Yugoslavia. 30 June 2006.
