= Hadji Sali Bey =

- Born: Sali (or Salih); Srebrenica, Sanjak of Zvornik, Ottoman Empire
- Died: October 1822; Travnik, Ottoman Empire
- Cause of death: Murdered by Celal Pasha
- Military career
- Allegiance: Ottoman Empire
- Branch: Sipahi (cavalry)
- Rank: kapıcıbaşı, ayan, bey
- Nickname: Hadji
- Units: Bosnia Eyalet; Sanjak of Zvornik
- Conflicts: First Serbian Uprising

Hadji Sali Bey (; fl. 1802–d. 1822) was an Ottoman official in Srebrenica, a town in the Sanjak of Zvornik of the Bosnia Eyalet. He was an ayan who held the titles of Imperial kapıcıbaşı and honorific bey. As part of the Ottoman campaign against the Serbian rebellion beginning in 1805, Hadji Sali Bey was dispatched to fight the Serbian rebels.

== Life ==
According to K. Nenadović, Hadji Sali Bey was "a Turk" who spoke and wrote in Serbian. His cousin was Deli Hasan Pasha, the mutesarrif ("plenipotentiary") of the Sanjak of Zvornik from 1797 to 1805. Sali Bey was an ayan in Srebrenica, with the rank of Imperial kapıcıbaşı. Sali Bey was an associate of the Nenadović family of the Valjevo nahija and was friendly with Serbs. He is included in the Memoirs of archpriest Matija Nenadović.

Hadji Sali Bey held the land tenure of the Serb-inhabited Osat region (on the left, Bosnian side of the Drina). In 1802, the Dahije leader Aganlija who ruled part of the Soko nahiya, sent his tax collectors to Azbukovica (on the right, Serbian side of the Drina). Hadji Sali Bey sent his men who stole the collected money. Aganlija asked Aleksa Nenadović to muster a Serb army to accompany in fighting Hadji Sali Bey, who Aganlija knew was an associate of Aleksa. Hadji Sali Bey and his cousin Hasan filled trenches on the other side of the Drina with soldiers. Aleksa managed to talk Hadji Sali Bey into returning the taxes. Due to this event, Hadji Sali bey was an opponent of the Dahije.

When the Serbs in the Sanjak of Smederevo ("Belgrade Pashalik") rose up against the Dahije (renegade Janissaries) in 1804, Hadji Sali Bey wrote accusations to the Porte about Dahije abuse on Serbs and that it was the reason they had risen. When Bekir Pasha, the Vizier of Bosnia, was given the mission to pacify the Belgrade Pashalik, Hadji Sali Bey advised rebel commander and archpriest Matija Nenadović to welcome Bekir Pasha without arms, as to show that they were loyal subjects. Hadji Sali Bey helped in the Porte's decision to send a commission regarding the uprising. Bekir Pasha and the Serbian rebels agreed on the assassination of the Dahije at Ada Kaleh. Despite getting rid of the Dahije, the Serbs decided for continued uprising and national liberation.

The new Vizier of Bosnia, Mustafa Pasha Ismailpašić, ordered for the mobilization of all of the Ottoman Bosnian army at Podrinje. Ismailpašić appointed Hasan Pasha, the mutesarrif of Zvornik, as the general of the campaign, with deputies Hadji Sali Bey of Srebrenica, Sinan Pasha Sijerčić of Goražde, Mehmed Agha of Višegrad, and Sarajevo Janissary başağa Memiš-aga Mačković. They were subsequently accompanied by Hasan Pasha of Banja Luka, Bayraktar Ali from Prusce, the mutesarrif of Klis Suleyman Pasha, Ibrahim Agha from Kobaš, and Mahmud Agha from Jezero.

When the Ottoman Bosnian army was ordered to destroy the Serbian rebels in 1805, Hadji Sali Bey sent letters to the Nenadović family ahead of his crossing over the Drina, telling them of how many troops he had, as to have a fair fight. The Serbian rebels besieged Šabac in January 1806. The Ottoman Bosnian army of 30,000 under Vidajić and Hasan Pasha attacked the rebels by the Drina. Karađorđe and Jakov Nenadović attacked the Bosnian troops at Zičko Polje, while Hadji Bey went from Soko into the Valjevo nahiya. At Brankovina, Hadji Bey burnt down the property of Jakov Nenadović. Jakov, despite being wounded, mustered an army that pushed Hadji Bey to Valjevo, which was burnt down by Hadji Bey, who then retreated to Soko. Hadji Bey sent Osman-Džora with 6,000 men to fight Jakov, but this detachment was decimated by 2,800 after being defeated by Jakov's 2,000 men at Čučuge. In July 1806, the Ottoman Bosnian army under Ibrahim Pasha crossed the Drina, with detachments under Hadji Sali Bey and Hasan Pasha of Srebrenica, to Valjevo and Šabac, respectively. The two detachments were then to unite at Palež. Hasan Pasha was destroyed at Duge Njive near Krnjići, then retreated to Šabac. Bekir Pasha now crossed the Drina with 7 pashas and 40,000 troops.

The Ottoman Bosnian army besieged Loznica held by Petar Moler, in August 1813, and sent the metropolitan of Zvornik to ask the rebels to surrender; Moler negotiated, the Turks suggesting that the Serbs present give up their weapons and find refuge with Hadji Sali Bey, "taken to be a Serb friend". Moler refused to surrender and broke through after three days in heavy rain, with 200 survivors out of 800.

Bosnian Vizier Celal Pasha murdered Sali Bey in 1822.

== Annotations ==
1. Known in Serbian as Hadži-Sali-beg (Хаџи-Сали-бег), Hadži-Beg (Хаџи-Бег), or simply Adži-beg (Аџи-бег). Known in Bosnian as Salih-beg Srebrenica. "hajji" is an honorific.

== Sources ==
- Batalaka, Lazar Arsenijević (1898). Историја српског устанка: део први [History of the Serbian Uprising: Part One]. Vol. I. Izd. Batalakinoga fonda – via Google Books.
- Milićević, Milan Đ. (1888). Поменик знаменитих људи у српског народа новијега доба. Издање Чупићеве задужбине – via Archive.org.
- Milosavljević, Petar (1979). "Бој на Иванковцу 1805.". Бој на Иванковцу 1805 [La bataille à Ivankovac en 1805]. Belgrade: SANU. pp. 11–66.
- Nenadović, Konstantin N. (1884). Живот и дела великог Ђорђа Петровића Кара-Ђорђа [Life and Deeds of Great Đorđe Petrović Kara-Đorđe]. Vol. II (1 ed.). Vienna: У Штампарији Јована Н. Вернаја – via Google Books.
- Nenadović, Konstantin N. (1903) [1883]. Живот и дела великог Ђорђа Петровића Кара-Ђорђа [Life and Deeds of Great Đorđe Petrović Kara-Đorđe]. Vol. I (2 ed.). Belgrade: Штампа Савића и Комп. – via Archive.org.
- Novaković, Stojan (1904). Устанак на дахије 1804 [Uprising against the Dahije]. Штампано у Државној штампарији. pp. 170- – via Archive.org.
- Pravni fakultet Sarajevo (1950). Istorisko-pravni zbornik: organ Opšteg seminara za istoriju drzave i prava. Pravni fakultet Sarajevo. p. 258. "Salih-beg Srebrenica"
- Protić, Kosta (1893). "Ратни догађаји из првога српског устанка под Карађорђем Петровићем 1804—1813". Годишњица Николе Чупића. XIII. Državna štamparija.
- Stojančević, Vladimir (1957). "Борбе за ослобођење Београда 1804–1806 године" (PDF). ГОДИШЊАК. IV. Музеј града Београда: 111–142.
- Stojkanović, Cvetko (2009). Сто годину Цркве у Црвици и развој духовног живота у Осату. Bajina Bašta. ISBN 978-86-88031-01-1.
- Teinović, Bratislav (2020). "Преглед српско-турског ратовања на Дрини (1804-1815)" (PDF). Vojnoistorijski glasnik. 2: 9–35.
- Vasić, Pavle, ed. (1985). Azbukovica: zemlja, ljudi i život. Samoupravna interesna zajednica kulture opštine Ljubovija.
