= White Mosque (Srebrenica) =

Mosque in Srebrenica, Bosnia and Herzegovina

- Bijela džamija
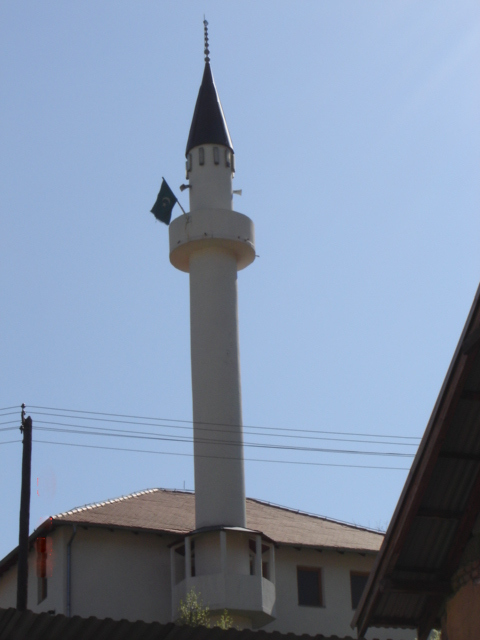
- Minaret of the White Mosque

- Location of the mosque in Bosnia and Herzegovina

Religion
- Affiliation: Islam
- Ecclesiastical or organizational status: Mosque: (17th century–1995); (since 2002– )
- Status: Active

Location
- Location: Srebrenica, Republika Srpska
- Country: Bosnia and Herzegovina
- Interactive map of White Mosque
- Coordinates: 44°06′10″N 19°18′00″E

Architecture
- Type: Mosque
- Style: Ottoman
- Funded by: Government of Malaysia (2002)
- Completed: 17th century (original); 2002 (rebuilt)
- Destroyed: 1995 (during the Bosnian War)
- Minaret: 1

The White Mosque (Bosnian: Bijela džamija), also known as the Hajji Skenderbeg's Mosque, is a mosque located in the town of Srebrenica, in eastern Bosnia and Herzegovina.

== History ==
Initially on the site was the Catholic Church of Saint Nicholas, built in 1394 by Croatian merchants from Dubrovnik (Ragusa) and dedicated to this patron saint of travelers. After the conquest of the area by the Ottoman Empire in the 15th century the Catholics started leaving the area.

The Ottoman-style mosque was built in the 17th century on the ruins of the church after the departure of the last Franciscans from Srebrenica. In 1935, the mosque underwent extensive restoration and extension work for another hall. Also, its appearance changed significantly at that time, and the minaret was in the middle of the building.

The army and police of Republika Srpska demolished the mosque to its foundations in 1995 during the Bosnian War. It was rebuilt with a donation from the government of Malaysia and reopened on September 28, 2002. Repair work on the roof and further renovation work through private donations was done in 2020.

In the courtyard of the mosque there is also a centuries-old Muslim cemetery (šehitluk).

== Gallery ==
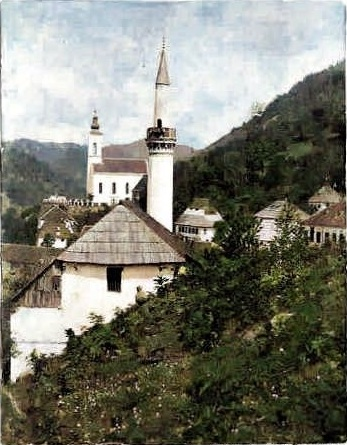
The mosque in 1905

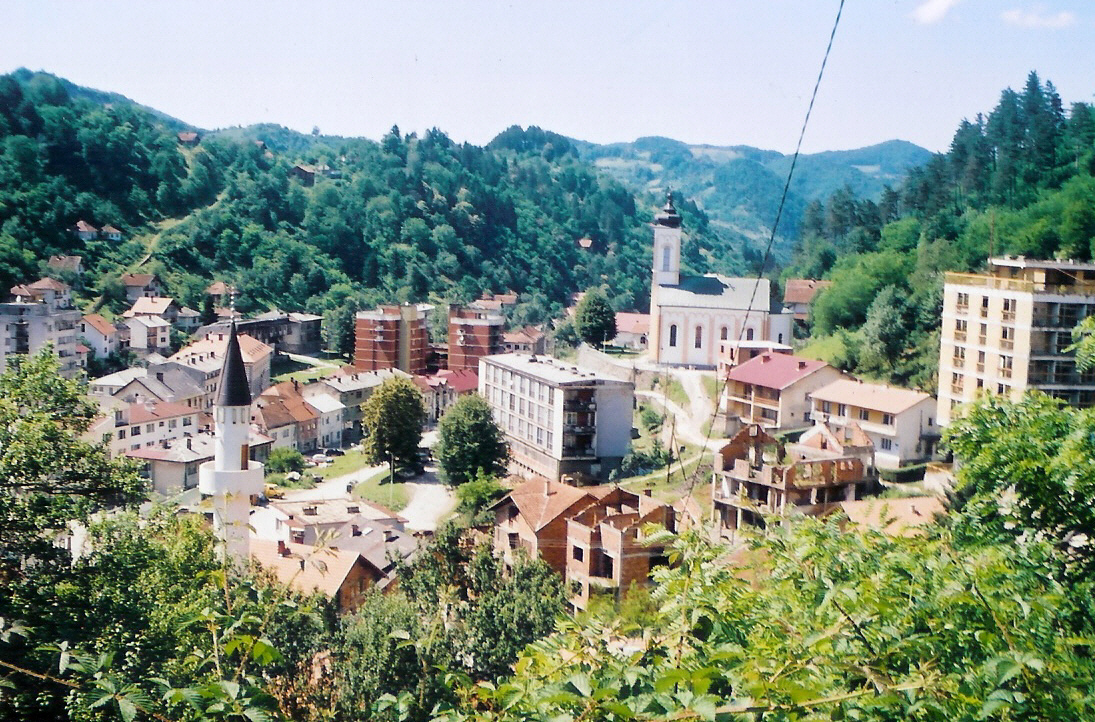
Srebrenica with the mosque to the left, in 2005

== See also ==
- Islam in Bosnia and Herzegovina
- List of mosques in Bosnia and Herzegovina
