= Palež (Srebrenica) =

- Village
- Location within Bosnia and Herzegovina
- Coordinates: 44°04′10″N 19°12′36″E
- Country: Bosnia and Herzegovina
- Municipality: Srebrenica
- Time zone: UTC+1 (CET)
  - Summer (DST): UTC+2 (CEST)

Palež (Serbian: Палеж) is a village in the municipality of Srebrenica, Bosnia and Herzegovina.
