= Blažijevići =

- Village
- Location within Bosnia and Herzegovina
- Coordinates: 44°11′19″N 19°14′18″E
- Country: Bosnia and Herzegovina
- Municipality: Srebrenica
- Time zone: UTC+1 (CET)
  - Summer (DST): UTC+2 (CEST)

Blažijevići (Serbian: Блажијевићи) is a village in the municipality of Srebrenica, Bosnia and Herzegovina.
