= Viogor =

Viogor Виогор
- Village
- Location within Bosnia and Herzegovina
- Coordinates: 44°06′03″N 19°15′36″E
- Country: Bosnia and Herzegovina
- Municipality: Srebrenica
- Time zone: UTC+1 (CET)
  - Summer (DST): UTC+2 (CEST)

Viogor (Serbian Cyrillic: Виогор) is a village in the municipality of Srebrenica, Bosnia and Herzegovina.
