= Sase Monastery =

Serbian Orthodox monastery near Srebrenica, Bosnia and Herzegovina

Coordinates: 44°07′22″N 19°22′01″E

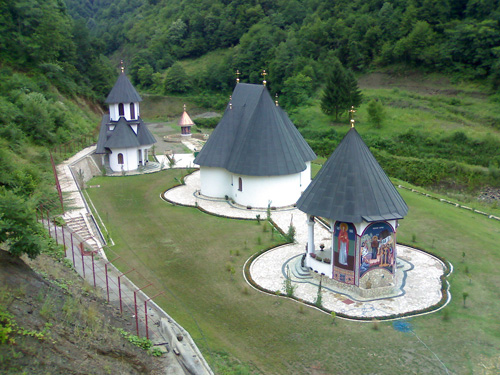
- Sase Monastery, pictured in 2016
- Sase Monastery
- Location: Srebrenica, Republic of Srpska
- Country: Bosnia and Herzegovina
- Denomination: Serbian Orthodox Church

The Sase Monastery (Serbian: Манастир Сасе, romanized: Manastir Sase) is a Serbian Orthodox monastery located in the mining village of Sase, in the hills between Srebrenica and Bratunac in northeastern Bosnia and Herzegovina.

== History ==
It was built in 1242 by Serbian King Stefan Uroš I (r. 1243–76), and was a metochion (property) of Hilandar. The foundation and walls of the church were unearthed and renovated in 1850.

A new renovation of the monastery began in 1989 when the foundations for the monastery residence were consecrated and a new copper roof was installed to mark the 750th anniversary of its existence. The beginning of the Bosnian War made the planned consecration ceremony of the monastery residence, which was planned for 1991, impossible. During the war beginning of 1992 the chapel suffered damage and the newly built residence was destroyed.

After the war through the efforts of Bishop Vasilije of Zvornik and Tuzla monastic life was revived. The old monastery chapel was demolished and a new one constructed in 2003.

The current head bishop of the monastery is Nikolaj, and it belongs to the Metropolitanate of Dabar and Bosnia.

== Architecture ==
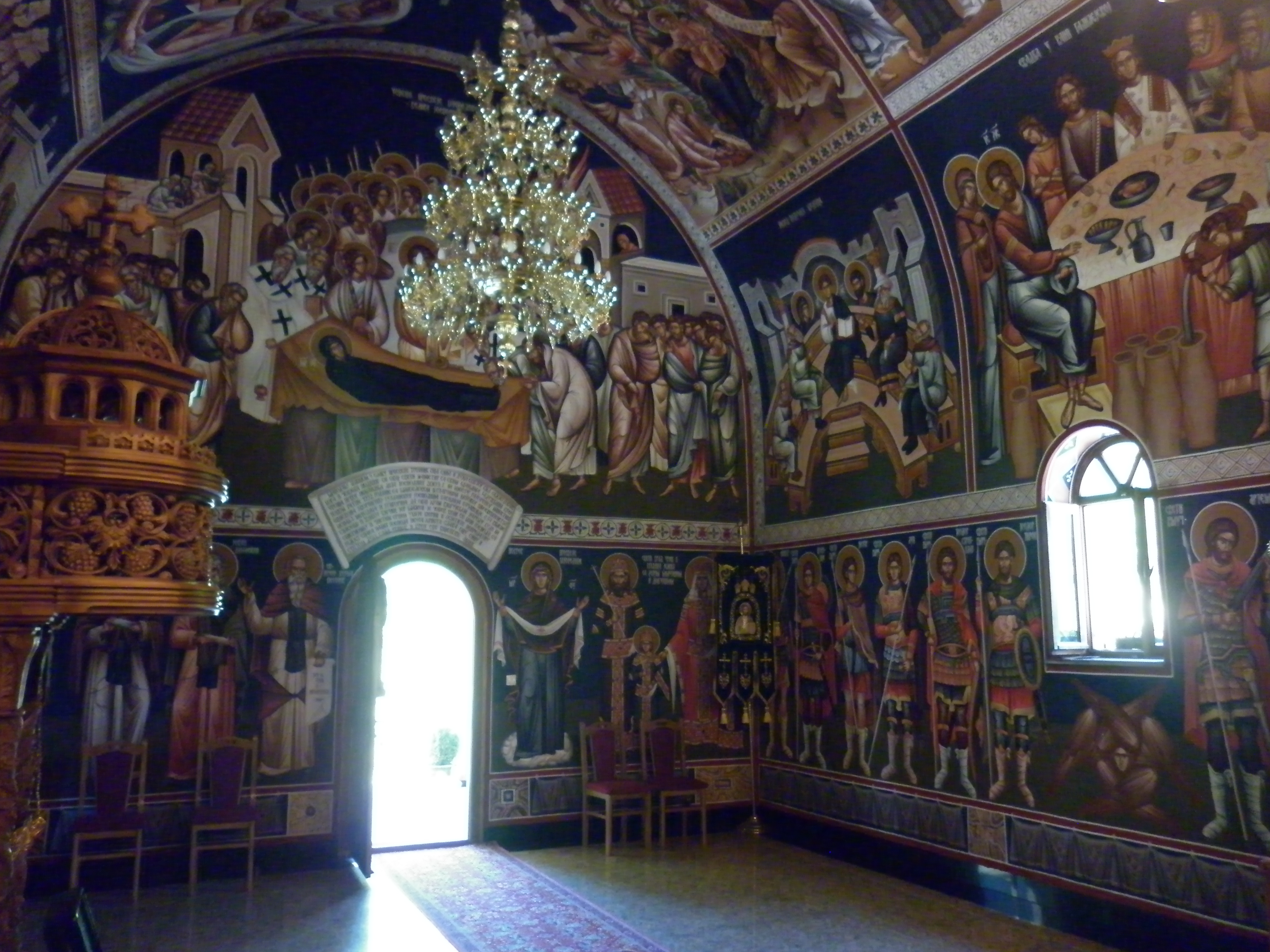
Interior with colourful frescoes

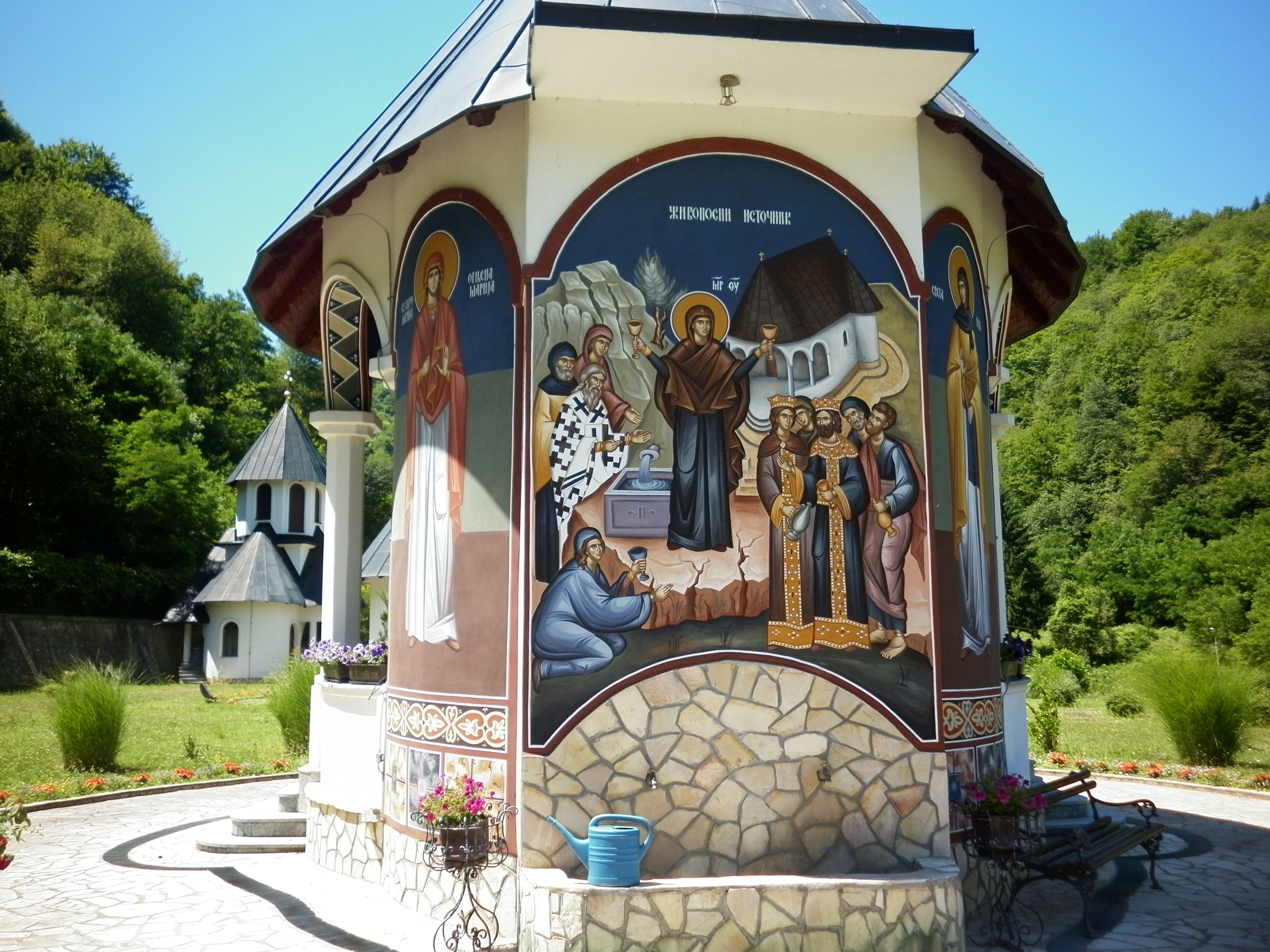
Ablution fountain

The rebuilt monastery consists of the chapel, the ablution fountain, and the residence. The interiors of the chapel are colourfully decorated with frescoes in the traditional style, depicting the lives of saints. An gilded iconostasis shields the altar.

A Roman tombstone that was excavated close-by is exhibited in the monastery courtyard.

== See also ==
- List of Serbian Orthodox monasteries
