= Mladen Grujičić =

Bosnian Serb politician (born

- Младен Грујичић
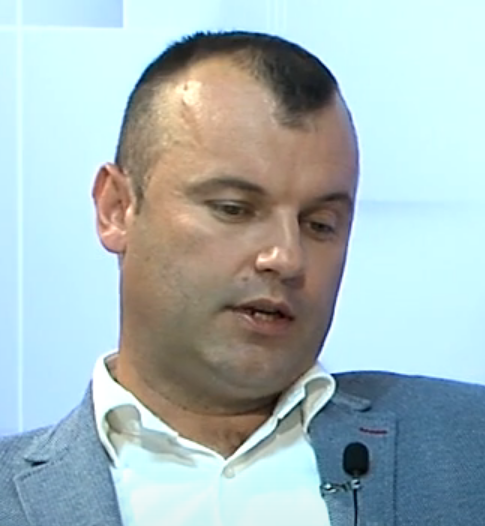
- Grujičić in 2020

Mayor of Srebrenica
- In office 8 November 2016 – 20 November 2024
- Preceded by: Ćamil Duraković
- Succeeded by: Miloš Vučić

Personal details
- Born: 13 April 1982 (age 44) Srebrenica, SR Bosnia and Herzegovina SFR Yugoslavia
- Party: Alliance of Independent Social Democrats
- Education: University of East Sarajevo
- Profession: Chemical technologist

Mladen Grujičić (Serbian Cyrillic: Младен Грујичић; born 13 April 1982) is a Bosnian Serb politician who served as mayor of Srebrenica from 2016 to 2024, a town and municipality located in the easternmost part of Republika Srpska, an entity of Bosnia and Herzegovina. He is a member of the Alliance of Independent Social Democrats.

== Biography ==
=== Early life and career ===
Grujičić was born in 1982 in Srebrenica. He left the town during the Bosnian War in which his father was killed fighting for the Army of Republika Srpska.

After finishing his studies at the Faculty of Technology in Zvornik which as a part of the University of East Sarajevo, he started his business career, and after that he was a high school professor in the chemistry group of subjects at the High School Center in Srebrenica.

For several years, he led the Municipal Organization of Families of Captured and Killed Fighters and Missing Civilians in Srebrenica, and he was named "Humanist of the Year" by the republic organization for 2010.

=== Political career ===
Grujičić started his political career as PDP member, and since 2012 has joined SNSD member and was a candidate for a member of local parliament in 2012.

On 10 July 2016, Mladen Grujičić a joint candidate of all Serb parties in Srebrenica started his campaign for the Mayor of Srebrenica for the 2016 local elections. His candidacy for mayor was announced on April 14, when a meeting of the leaders of nine Serb political parties from Srebrenica was held. At that time, it was agreed to run in the elections with a joint candidate for mayor within the coalition "Together for Srebrenica".

Grujičić defeated his rival Ćamil Duraković with 54.38% of the popular vote and took office as the new mayor of Srebrenica on 8 November 2016. This was the first time in 17 years that a Serb candidate won the elections. His mandate has been marked with numerous political and financial scandals. Possibly the reason why he was not promoted as a candidate again in 2024.

=== Srebrenica genocide controversy ===
Grujičić has been called a Serbian nationalist and Srebrenica genocide denier by the Bosniak public and his opponents. Talking about the Srebrenica massacre, Grujičić himself said this during the campaign:

"It is an imposed story and it will fall sometime. No Serb and most Bosniaks living here believe in the Hague farce. Bosniaks who say that there was no genocide are even declared insane."
