= Petriča =

- Village
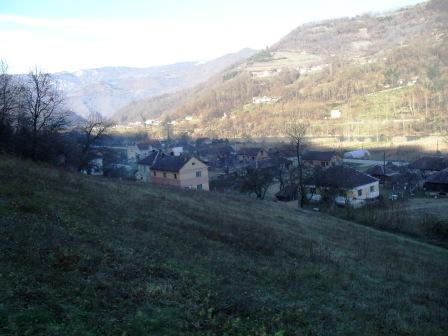

- Location within Bosnia and Herzegovina
- Coordinates: 44°01′N 19°37′E
- Country: Bosnia and Herzegovina
- Municipality: Srebrenica
- Time zone: UTC+1 (CET)
  - Summer (DST): UTC+2 (CEST)

Petriča (Serbian Cyrillic: Петрича) is a village in the municipality of Srebrenica, Bosnia and Herzegovina.
