= Skelani =

Skelani Скелани
- Village
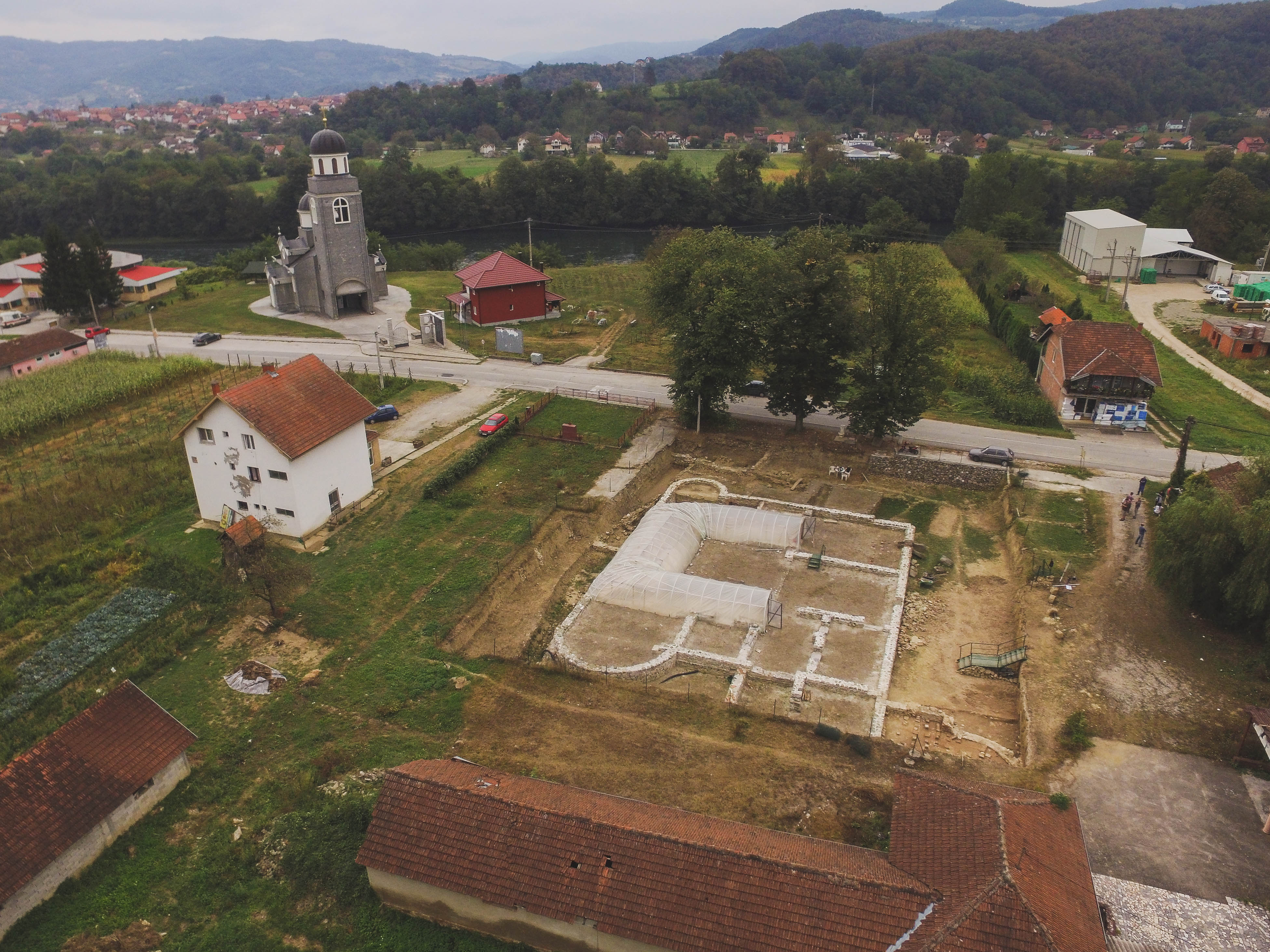
- Excavated Roman ruins in Skelani

- Location within Republika Srpska Location within Bosnia and Herzegovina
- Coordinates: 43°58′31″N 19°32′08″E
- Country: Bosnia and Herzegovina
- Municipality: Srebrenica

Population (2013)
  - Total: 893
- Time zone: UTC+1 (CET)
  - Summer (DST): UTC+2 (CEST)

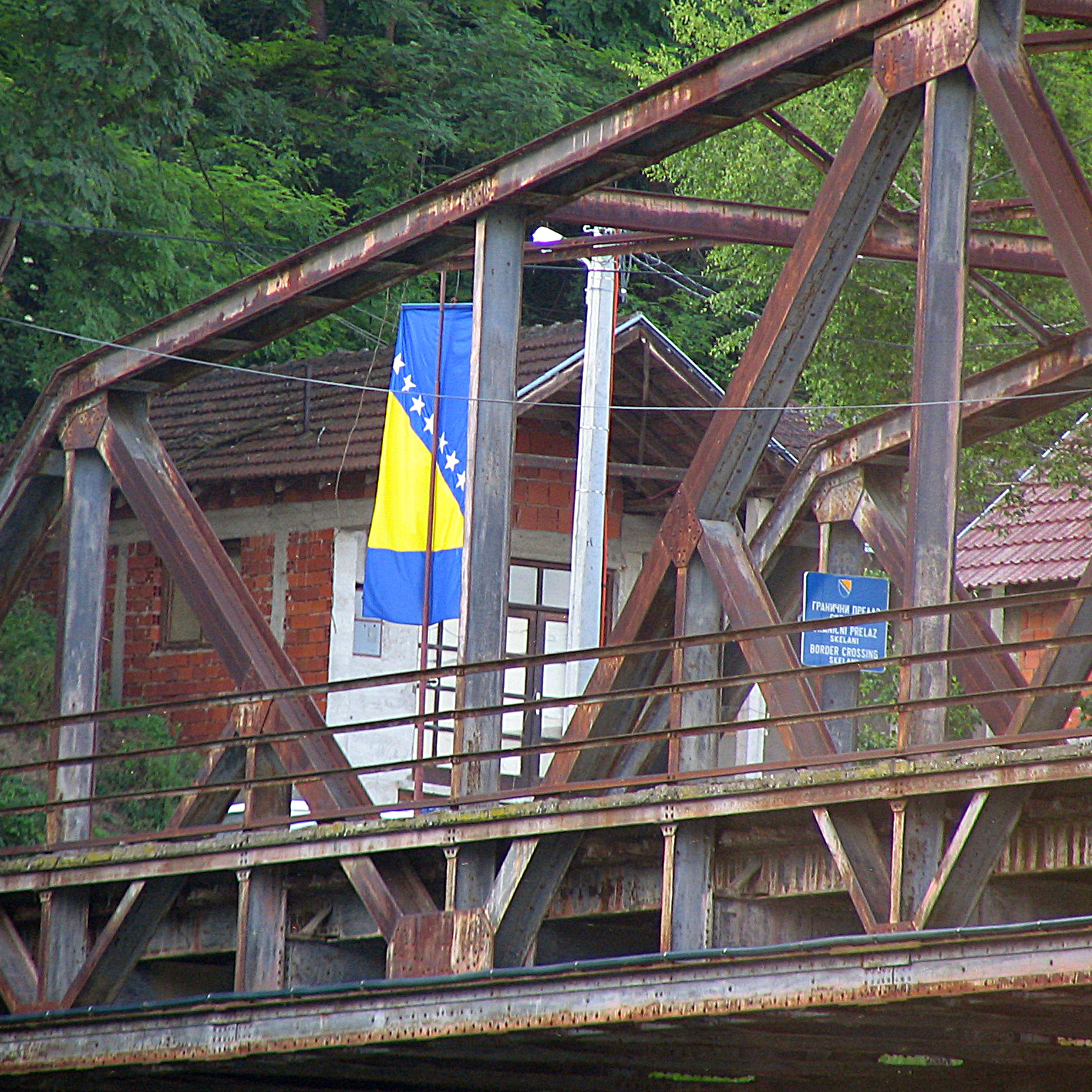
Skelani BiH border crossing from Drina river.

Skelani (Serbian Cyrillic: Скелани) is a village in the municipality of Srebrenica, in the Republika Srpska entity of Bosnia and Herzegovina.

== Location ==
Altitude: 242 m

According to the 1991 census the population of the town was 1123 - 950 Muslims (84.59%), 160 Serbs (14.25%), 7 Yugoslavs (0.62%) and 6 Unknown/Others (0.53%)

The population of the commune was 4283 - 2847 Muslims (66.47%), 1311 Serbs (30.61%), 16 Yugoslavs (0.37%) and 109 Unknown/Others (2.54%)

Skelani is 50 km from the town of Srebrenica, via difficult roads through the Zeleni Jadar Mountains. The village is much closer to the town of Bajina Basta in Serbia, only 3 km away by bridge across the Drina River. Traditional lines of communication were disrupted by the Bosnian war, significantly affecting life in Skelani, which has been described by the Bosnian saying that when you live in isolation you end up “ni na nebu ni na zemlji” -‘neither in the sky nor on earth’.

Before the Yugoslav wars Skelani had very close links administratively and culturally with the Bajina Basta municipality. The nearest hospital to Skelani was in Bajina Basta and many children from Skelani were born and attended school there. Bajina Basta was a centre for employment and shopping for residents of Skelani. Telephone connections and power came via Bajina Basta.

In 1992 the village of Skelani had about 400 households and about 1,200 residents, predominantly Muslim. It was basically an agricultural community, with some livestock raising activity. Relations between Serbs and Muslims were described as good but tensions began to build up after the end of 1989. Branches of the SDA and SDS political parties were established.

When the war began Skelani was cut off from Srebrenica but also from its connections with Serbia. Since the war Skelani has remained isolated, cut off from access to many basic necessities. Instead of being able to go to Bajina Basta to hospital or go shopping residents have to travel to Srebrenica over still difficult roads. Time-consuming international border procedures, mistrust and prejudice make crossing the border into Serbia difficult.

The Sase Mine, in Skelani, a major producer of lead and zinc, was heavily damaged during the war. In 1998 the mine's production capacity was estimated at 6,500 t/yr of lead and 4,000 t/yr of zinc.

== Early history ==
Géza Alföldy's reconstruction of the cultural and ethnic affinities of the indigenous population of northeast Dalmatia around the time of the Roman conquest early in the 1st century AD., drawing mostly on the evidence of personal names, linked the Middle Drina area (Skelani) with the historical Scordisci, a powerful Celtic group whose conflict with the Romans dominated events in the central Balkans from the mid 2nd century BC to the early 1st century AD. After the conquest this group formed the civitas of the Dindari (listed by Pliny the Elder within Dalmatia), whom a fragmentary inscription appears to locate in the Skelani area.

The Roman municipium of Skelani, situated at a major crossing of the Drina river, was a post of beneficiarii consulares (Romans wielding authority entrusted to them by a magistrate or office-holder). It was in existence before the end of the reign of Antoninus Pius and Skelani and the Roman town at Rogatica may originally have been Flavian creations.

The territory of the city comprised the territory of the Dindari extending beyond the middle Drina around Skelani east of the Drina to include Ljubovija, Bajina Basta, Užice and Požega. It may have been named Malvesatium.

In 2008 the largest mosaic floor from Roman times ever found in the Balkans was discovered in Skelani by Bosnian archaeologists led by Mirko Babić director of the local museum in Bijeljina. According to Babić "There are 40 square metres of mosaics that are unique in terms of the diversity of their colours, images and ornaments of marvellous vividness". As well as the mosaic flooring, dated to the first century A.D., 80–180 cm below the soil surface are other ruins of buildings and streets of the Roman town. Babić argues that the ruins discovered to date indicate that Skelani was a rich and important centre in the Roman era.

== Bosnian War ==
On 14 or 15 April 1992, volunteers from the Socialist Federal Republic of Yugoslavia, with the co-operation of the SFRY authorities, crossed the Drina River and entered Skelani with the purpose of assisting the Bosnian Serbs take control of the area and forcibly remove the area's Muslim population.

On 1 May 1992, Serbians in the area declared Skelani to be a Serbian village. On 7 May it fell into the hands of Serbian forces. All Muslims in the area were ordered to give up their firearms, mainly hunting rifles and the like. On 8 May the removal of the village's Muslim population began. Serbians wearing Chetnik garb came into Vahida Selimovic's house and shot all the male adults. The women were transferred to Novi Pazar. A Bosnian Muslim woman Fatima reported how when shooting began they were surrounded and could not escape. The Serbians entered the village four hours later and immediately began setting houses on fire, looking for men and executing them. "When they got to our house, they ordered us to come out with hands raised above our heads, including the children. There were four men among us, and they shot them in front of us. ... I saw another six men killed nearby." She and other women and children were taken to the police station where they were insulted but not physically harmed before being transported out of Bosnia. (p. 257, War Crimes in Bosnia-Hercegovina, Volume II. New York: Helsinki Watch. Human Rights Watch, 1993)

On 9 May, the independent Serbian news agency Borba reported that after Skelani fell, 550 Muslims (mostly women, children, and the elderly) were expelled from the village. After proclaiming Skelani a Serbian village Serbian forces refused to allow any Muslims access into the area. (Interviewed by Helsinki Watch, War Crimes in Bosnia-Herzegovina 41, 41-43 (1992).

In a January 1993 offensive, Naser Orić, commander with his army from the enclave of Srebrenica, attacked Skelani. Hundreds of Serb civilians fled across the Drina River into Serbia in boats. Oric's forces advanced to about a hundred yards away from the bridge in Skelani, seeking to capture it and blow it up. The Serb forces resisted the attack.

Stories of fleeing civilians shot down on the Skelani bridge caused anger in Serbia. Which as propaganda against Bosniak Muslims. Ratko Mladić launched a counterattack that pushed Muslim forces back towards the town of Srebrenica.

A unit of Russian volunteers was active in the Skelani area in the early part of 1993, under the command of Lieutenant Alexander Alexandrov, who had previously seen action in Transdniestr and Karabakh and was killed in May 1993.

The names of four men from Skelani were on the list compiled by Ibro Nuhanovic of 239 male refugees from Srebrenica sheltering on the UNPROFOR Base in Potočari who were handed over by the UN Dutchbat contingent to Bosnian Serb Army commander General Ratko Mladic and become victims of the Srebrenica genocide in July 1995: Sefik Hasanović (1959), Mehmed Mehimović (1950), Ðemal Ðananović (1980) and Murat Ljeskovica (1936).

== Municipality of Skelani ==
In 1992, the National Assembly of Republika Srpska created the municipality of Skelani, without any consultation with the majority Bosniak population of the municipality of Srebrenica or of the Skelani area.

In December 1999, the municipality of Skelani was abolished by the international community's post-war High Representative Wolfgang Petritsch. According to Petritsch, the RS National Assembly wanted to isolate the town of Srebrenica and deprive it of security, territory, and economic resources for political reasons.

The municipality's continued existence was seen as having a negative effect on the efforts of the newly established joint administration in Srebrenica to encourage the free return of refugees and displaced persons return to their homes of origin (a constitutional right). By cutting Srebrenica off from its economic hinterland, it hampered the town's chances of economic recovery and interfered with the creation of the "political, economic and social conditions conducive to the voluntary return and harmonious reintegration of refugees and displaced persons" called for by Annex 7 of the Dayton Peace Agreement.

== The 3rd Skelani Platoon and its participation in the Srebrenica massacre ==
On 29 July 2008, a group of special police force members of the 3rd "Skelani" Platoon of the 2nd Šekovići Detachment of the Special Police Brigade were found guilty of genocide by the War Crimes Chamber of the Criminal Division of the Court of Bosnia and Herzegovina. This was the first genocide trial in Bosnia and Herzegovina.

They were found to have taken part in the massacre over 1000 Bosniak men at an agricultural warehouse at Kravica where men trying to escape from Srebrenica were taken after surrendering to the Army of the Republika Srpska (VRS) having been promised that they would be safe.

The court established that the defendants secured and controlled the Bratunac–Milići road, including the section near the Kravica Cooperative warehouse in Kravica on 12 and 13 July 1995. The soldiers conducted reconnaissance missions on the road and attacked Bosniaks with tanks and other weapons. Milenko Trifunović encouraged the Bosniaks to surrender by giving them false guarantees of safety. Thousands of captured men were held in and around a meadow at Sandići before taken by VRS soldiers to locations including the Kravica Cooperative warehouse.

On 13 July 1995 over one thousand prisoners held at the warehouse were executed. The soldiers fired automatic weapons and threw hand grenades at them. Seven of the accused took part in shooting the prisoners, after which Petar Mitrović, Slobodan Jakovljević, and Branislav Medan were sent to the back of the warehouse to prevent any prisoners escaping while Brano Džinić took two boxes of grenades and threw them at the killed and wounded who were begging for help.

The primary defendant Miloš Stupar, commander of the Šekovići Detachment, was sentenced to 40 years imprisonment, the Skelani Platoon's commander Milenko Trifunović was sentenced to 42 years, Aleksandar Radovanović to 42 years, Brano Džinić to 42 years, Slobodan Jakovljević to 40 years, Branislav Medan to 40 years, and Petar Mitrović to 38 years. Velibor Maksimović, Dragiša Živanović, Milovan Matić, and Miladin Stevanović were acquitted of all charges.

== Reconciliation work ==
A USAID-funded Cross-Border Cooperation and Reconciliation (CBCR) project has worked to bring residents from both sides of the international border together in a football tournament in Skelani. Local NGOs and the CBCR project encouraged teams from Bajina Basta and Bosnian Serb communities to join teams mostly from the municipality of Srebrenica in this tournament as a step towards encouraging cooperation and cross-border and inter-ethnic contacts.

The tournament has provided an opportunity for people who grew up together, worked together and even fought against each other to meet up again after years of isolation (for example the members of the re-formed multi-ethnic team representing the village of Crvice).

The "Zelja" Women's Association, founded in 1999, assists local and returnee women by providing courses in English, computers, and sewing. It has established a playground for children, and provides food packages to returnees and the elderly. The organization also provides legal counseling, and campaigns against domestic violence. Zelja supports two-way return, and sponsors activities and seminars to promote reconciliation among local residents.
