= Crvica, Srebrenica =

Crvica Црвица
- Village
- Location within Bosnia and Herzegovina
- Coordinates: 44°00′58″N 19°34′50″E
- Country: Bosnia and Herzegovina
- Municipality: Srebrenica
- Time zone: UTC+1 (CET)
  - Summer (DST): UTC+2 (CEST)

Crvica (Serbian Cyrillic: Црвица) is a village in the municipality of Srebrenica, Bosnia and Herzegovina. Serbian revolutionary Kara-Marko Vasić was born in the village.
