= Milan Obrenović =

Milan Obrenović may refer to:

- Milan Obrenović II, Prince of Serbia (1819–1839)
- Milan Obrenović IV (1854–1901)
- Milan Obrenović (revolutionary) (c. 1767–1810)
