= Ratkovići, Srebrenica =

Ratkovići Ратковићи
- Village
- Location within Bosnia and Herzegovina
- Coordinates: 44°04′53″N 19°26′16″E
- Country: Bosnia and Herzegovina
- Municipality: Srebrenica
- Time zone: UTC+1 (CET)
  - Summer (DST): UTC+2 (CEST)

Ratkovići (Serbian Cyrillic: Ратковићи) is a village in the municipality of Srebrenica, Bosnia and Herzegovina.

== Bosnian War ==
In 1991, Ratkovići had 338 inhabitants of which 337 (99.7%) were Serbs. On June 21, 1992, Bosnian Muslims killed 24 Serbs from Ratkovići. The Muslims attacked the village in the morning, where they killed unarmed civilians and burned their houses. All 24 fatalities were civilians, and among them included women, children, and physically challenged people.

The Hague Tribunal on July 3, 2008, freed Naser Orić of charges for crimes in Ratkovići because there was no evidence of his command, and thus no evidence to support him being responsible. To date, no one has been convicted for the 24 civilian deaths. A monument containing the names of the civilians who were killed is erected in Rankovići.

According to a recent census, there are now 53 inhabitants living in Ratkovići (Census 2013).
