= Toplica (Srebrenica) =

Toplica Топлица
- Village
- Location within Bosnia and Herzegovina
- Coordinates: 43°59′42″N 19°27′07″E
- Country: Bosnia and Herzegovina
- Municipality: Srebrenica
- Time zone: UTC+1 (CET)
  - Summer (DST): UTC+2 (CEST)

Toplica (Serbian Cyrillic: Топлица) is a village in the municipality of Srebrenica, Bosnia and Herzegovina.
