= Gornja Orovica =

Gornja Orovica Горња Оровица (Serbian)
- Village (Selo)
- Location within Serbia
- Coordinates: 44°13′N 19°31′E
- Country: Serbia
- Municipality: Ljubovija
- Time zone: UTC+1 (CET)
  - Summer (DST): UTC+2 (CEST)

Gornja Orovica (Serbian Cyrillic: Горња Оровица) is a village in Serbia. It is situated in the Ljubovija municipality, in the Mačva District of Central Serbia. The village had a Serb ethnic majority and a population of 415 in 2002.

The hill of Baurić (Баурић) is located in the village, and it includes the remnants of a rebel earth fortification (šanac, schanze) that is a cultural monument.

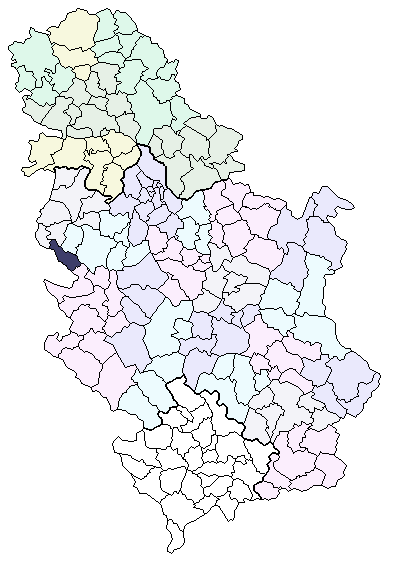
Location of the Ljubovija municipality in Serbia

== Historical population ==
- 1948: 830
- 1953: 923
- 1961: 870
- 1971: 751
- 1981: 635
- 1991: 498
- 2002: 415

== See also ==
- List of places in Serbia
