= Operation Shield '94 =

Offensive in Western Bosnia (1994)

- Part of the Bosnian War and the Inter-Bosnian Muslim War
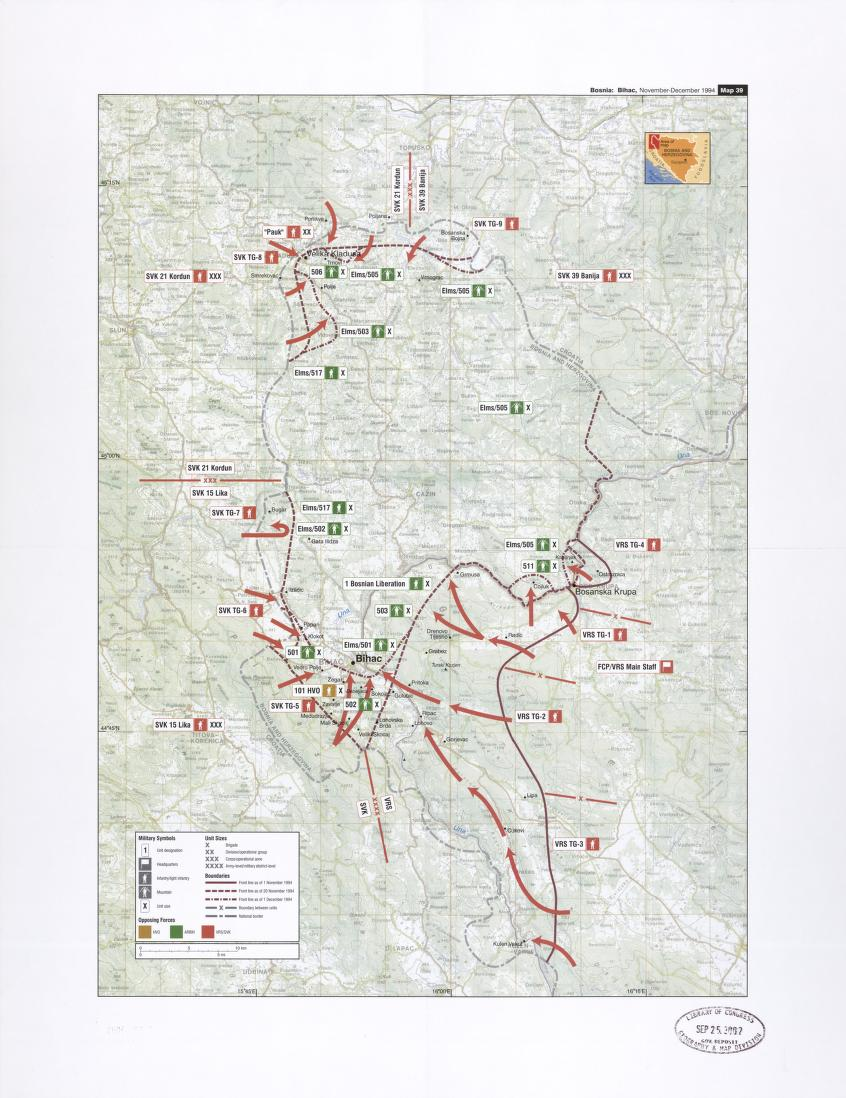
- VRS Offensive Operations in the Bosnian Krajina Region, 4–20 November 1994
Date	4–20 November 1994
Location	Western Bosnia 44°48′N 15°52′E
Result	VRS and SVK victory
Territorial changes	Serb forces occupy the territories and surroundings south of Bihać

Belligerents
Republika Srpska; Republic of Serbian Krajina	Bosnia and Herzegovina

Commanders and leaders
Republika Srpska; Manojlo Milovanović	Atif Dudaković; Izet Nanić

Units involved
Army of Republika Srpska; 1st Krajina Corps; 2nd Krajina Corps; Garda Panteri; Special Operations Unit; Special Anti-Terrorist Unit; Special Forces Unit "Drina Wolves"; Army of Serbian Krajina; 2nd Guards Brigade; 15th Lika Corps; 103rd Light Infantry Brigade	Army of the Republic of Bosnia and Herzegovina; 5th Corps; 501st Mountain Brigade; 502nd Mountain Brigade; 503rd Mountain Brigade; 505th Bužim Brigade; 511th Mountain Brigade; 517th Mountain Brigade; Croatian Defence Council

Strength
6,500–14,000	11,000–14,000

Casualties and losses
193 killed	600–700 killed

Operation Shield '94 (Serbian Cyrillic: Operajica Štit '94, Операција Штит '94) refers to the offensive in Western Bosnia from the 4 November to 20 November 1994, the key goal was to fully destroy the 5th Corps, and to recapture lands lost during Operation Grmeč 94. It resulted in a Serbian victory.

== Background ==
In October 1994, the 5th Corps of the ARBiH, led by Atif Dudaković, launched a major offensive operation called "Grmeč 94". The objective of the operation was to capture the Grmeč plateau. The ARBiH forces, consisting of approximately 13,000 soldiers, advanced from the northern parts of the enclave, aiming to capture several key villages and the former base of the JNA in Grmeč. On October 25, the ARBiH launched a powerful attack on the defense lines of the VRS brigades, occupying several villages and advancing towards the villages of Ripač and Radići. The VRS units retreated towards these villages, abandoning their positions.

Over the next few days, the ARBiH forces continued to advance, capturing more territory and pushing towards Bosanski Petrovac and Krupa na Una. By October 27, they had occupied around 150 square kilometers of Serbian territory. However, the Army of Republika Srpska chief of staff, Manojlo Milovanović, demanded that the United Nations condemn the Muslim offensive and return to their initial positions. UNPROFOR responded with a threat of NATO bombing, which was seen as an unusual response. On October 28, the President of the Republika Srpska, Radovan Karadžić, declared a "state of war" in the zone of responsibility of the 2nd Krajina Corps of the VRS and mobilized all able-bodied men who could bear arms in that area.

The ARBiH corps achieved its greatest success since the beginning of the war on October 29-31, surrounding Krupa na Una and entering Kulen Vakuf. The total occupied territory from October 25 to October 31 was around 250 square kilometers. However, on October 29, the VRS units prepared for defense of Krupa na Una and successfully repelled a Muslim attack. The Muslim forces were unable to surround the city again over the next five days, and their attempts to expand their occupied territory to the east were repelled.

== Order of Battle ==
=== Phase 1 ===
Serbian general Manojlo Milovanović is given orders to liberate land lost to Bosnian forces during "Operation Grmeć 94". He is accompanied by multiple tactical groups to spearhead the operation. In the first stages of the Operation rapid progress is made and the Bihać-Petrovac area is recaptured. The 5th Corps then realize Serbian forces were building up on the border. Elements of the 502nd and 501st Bihać brigades burst into action, however they were overrun by the Serbs. The Serbs then captured the village of Cukovi. The Serbs then attempted to capture the village of Ripać, which was lost in Operation Grmeć 94. Ripać was a key position, as it had positions that led to Bihać. The first Serbian Brigade advanced to Bihać, a commander of the brigade, Balać was killed in action during the offensive. Despite this, ARBiH resistance was weak, and the 1st Serbian brigade pushed back elements of soldiers from units; 503rd Cazin Brigade, 511th Krupa Brigade, and the 1st Bosnian Liberation Brigade. The Serbs then recaptured Veliki, and occupied 5 kilometers of land, after that, they took the important Drenovo-Tijesno road, also pushing back the Elite 505th Bužim Brigade and the 511th Brigade. Southwest of Bihać, an attack is launched by the 103rd SVK brigade, the goal of it was to take joint HVO–ARBiH lines, the attacked garnered little gains, however an airstrike was launched on ARBiH ammo deposits, successfully trapping down the Army of the Republic of Bosnia and Herzegovina in Bihać. Manojlo Milovanović would stop the offensive for a few days, to call for the surrender of the ARBiH in Bihać, however the ARBiH continued fighting, Manojlo Milovanović then continued the offensive to complete the first stage of the operation, the 3 Serbian tactical groups advanced their way through, despite fierce ARBiH resistance, they pushed the ARBiH 6 kilometers back. 4 days later, all the land lost from Operation Grmeć 94 is recaptured.

=== Operation Spider ===
The Serbian Army of Krajina and the National Defence of the Autonomous Province of Western Bosnia would then join the Second Phase of Operation Shield the goal of the Second Phase was to completely destroyed the 5th Corps. The Autonomous Province of Western Bosnia had been temporarily destroyed during Operation Tiger. However, a new operation named "Operation Spider" would be under-taken to destroy the ARBiH in Bihać.

== Aftermath ==
The goals of Operation Shield 94 had been partially met, with the first stage of Shield 94 being completed, mainly because general Milovanović feared a repeat of what happened during the Aftermath of Operation Lukavac 93, the land captured by the Serbs during Lukavac 93 was given to the United Nations, they then gave it to the Bosniaks. This Including pressure from the United Nations on the leadership of Republika Srpska. The "Bihac Safe area" had been mostly taken by the Serbs. This resulted in NATO air striking a Serbian Air Base in Udbina on 21 November.

=== Re-establishment of the Autonomous Province of Western Bosnia ===
The APZB would be completely re-established in Operation Spider, which was the Second Phase of Operation Shield 94. Operation Storm would be launched in 1995, with the APZB and Serbian Krajina collapsing.

== Sources ==
- Central Intelligence Agency, Office of Russian and European Analysis (2002). Balkan Battlegrounds: A Military History of the Yugoslav Conflict, 1990–1995, Volume 1. Washington, D.C.: Central Intelligence Agency. ISBN 978-0-16-066472-4.
- Central Intelligence Agency, Office of Russian and European Analysis (2002). Balkan Battlegrounds: a Military History of the Yugoslav conflict, 1990–1995. Vol. 2. Washington, D.C.: Central Intelligence Agency. ISBN 978-0-16-066472-4.
