= Operation Grmeč =

1994 Bosnian War operation

Operation Grmeč 94
- Part of Bosnian War
Date	25–31 October 1994
Location	Grmeč mountain region, near Bihać, western Bosnia and Herzegovina
Result	ARBiH victory
Territorial changes	ARBiH captures ~250 km² of territory including Kulen Vakuf and parts of Grabež Plateau

Belligerents
Republic of Bosnia and Herzegovina	Republika Srpska

Commanders and leaders
(Republic of Bosnia and Herzegovina) Atif Dudaković	(Republika Srpska) Grujo Borić

Units involved
Army of the Republic of Bosnia and Herzegovina; 5th Corps; 501st Mountain Brigade; 502nd Mountain Brigade; 503rd Mountain Brigade; 511th Mountain Brigade; 505th Bužim Brigade; 1st Liberation Brigade	Army of Republika Srpska; 2nd Krajina Corps; 11th Krupa Light Infantry Brigade

Strength
~15,000	Unknown

Casualties and losses
Unknown	Unknown

Operation Grmeč 94 was a major offensive launched by the Army of the Republic of Bosnia and Herzegovina's (ARBiH) 5th Corps under the command of Atif Dudaković in late October 1994. The operation targeted Bosnian Serb positions south and east of Bihać and represented a bold shift from defensive to offensive operations following the 5th Corps' victories over the Autonomous Province of Western Bosnia.

== Background ==
By October 1994, the 5th Corps had solidified its control over the Bihać enclave, having defeated Fikret Abdić's breakaway forces and withstood the Operation Breza '94 counteroffensive launched by the VRS. The Corps, who were battle-hardened and deeply loyal to their charismatic commander Atif Dudaković, was now eager to press its advantage.

== The offensive ==
The operation commenced on 25 October 1994. Almost the entire 5th Corps was committed to the offensive, with only minimal forces left to defend the western flank against the Krajina Serb Army. The goal was to drive Bosnian Serb forces off the Grabež Plateau and push deeper into Serb-held territories around Bosanska Krupa and Bosanski Petrovac.

The attack achieved near-total surprise. ARBiH brigades, including the 501st, 502nd, and 503rd Mountain Brigades, as well as the 1st Bosnian Liberation Brigade, quickly captured the strategic Grabež barracks and much of the plateau. These positions had long served as launching points for Serb artillery strikes on Bihać. For the first time in years, the city's residents could breathe without the constant fear of shellfire.

Over the next two days, ARBiH troops advanced rapidly, capturing over 100 km^{2} of territory. The 501st and 502nd Mountain Brigades pushed south toward Ripac and further toward Kulen Vakuf and Bosanski Petrovac. Simultaneously, the 503rd, 511th Mountain, and 1st Liberation Brigades drove eastward along the southern bank of the Una River toward Bosanska Krupa.

== Serb retreat and UN response ==
Facing a swift collapse of their front, VRS forces under Major General Grujo Borić retreated in disarray, abandoning valuable equipment and supplies. The Grabež barracks provided much-needed materiel for the poorly equipped Bosnian Army.

By 27 October, ARBiH had taken up to 150 km^{2} and was pressing into Bosanska Krupa and the southern approaches to Bosanski Petrovac. An estimated 3,500 to 10,000 Serb civilians fled ahead of the Bosnian advance, indicating a sharp drop in confidence in the VRS's ability to hold the region.

The United Nations came under fire from the VRS leadership for allegedly allowing a major offensive to be launched from what was designated a demilitarized "UN Safe Area". VRS Main Staff Chief Manojlo Milovanovic issued a demand that ARBiH pull back to pre-offensive lines or face retaliation. Radovan Karadžić soon declared a "state of war" in northwest Bosnia and ordered full mobilization.

== Climax and stalemate ==
By 29 October, ARBiH units had encircled Bosanska Krupa but were unable to capture it outright. The 511th Mountain Brigade and 505th Motorized Brigade launched repeated assaults, engaging in intense house-to-house fighting, but VRS defenders from the 11th Krupa Light Infantry Brigade held their ground. To the south, Kulen Vakuf was successfully captured.

Despite further gains of up to 30 km^{2} on 30–31 October, the Bosnian Army's lines became overextended. With logistics lagging and VRS counterattacks imminent, the offensive stalled. ARBiH now faced the difficult task of consolidating its gains and defending the newly won territory.

== Aftermath ==
Operation Grmeč 94 marked a significant moment for the 5th Corps and for the broader war in northwest Bosnia. It demonstrated the growing professionalism and boldness of the ARBiH and exposed cracks in the VRS's defenses. While the offensive ultimately stalled short of Bosanska Krupa, the operation laid the groundwork for future advances and helped shift momentum in favor of the Bosnian army.

== See also ==
- Operation Breza 94
- Operation Sana 95
- Atif Dudaković
- 5th Corps (ARBiH)
