= 502nd Brigade (ARBiH) =

502nd Knightly Mountain Brigade of ARBIH
- 502. Viteška brdska brigada
- Active: 19 July 1992-1995
- Country: Bosnia and Herzegovina
- Branch: Army of the Republic of Bosnia and Herzegovina
- Type: Infantry
- Garrison/HQ: Western Bihać
- Nicknames: Legendarna druga (Legendary second) Tigrovi (Because of the strike battalion and Reconnaissance-Sabotage Company Tigers, Tiger was used also on the brigade patches and flag as representing symbol.)
- Engagements: Bosnian War; Siege of Bihać (1992-95); Operation Tiger (1994); Operation Grmeč; Intra-Bosnian Muslim War; Operation Shield '94; Operation Sana

Commanders
- Notable commanders: Atif Dudakovic; Aleksandar Mrenica; Sead Toromanovic; Ekrem Karabegovic; Hamdija Abdić; Salih Dizdarić; Sidik Smlatić; Mirsad Litrić; Jusuf Lipovača; Adil Bešić

The 502nd Knightly Mountain Brigade (Bosnian: 502. viteška brdska brigada) was a military brigade during the Bosnian War which operated in the Bihać pocket and was part of the 5th Corps. It was formed on the July 19, 1992, as the Second Bihać Muslim-Croat Infantry Brigade in the settlement Žegar in Bihać. It was named "Muslim-Croat" because there was one battalion which was filled with soldiers of the Croat nationality. The brigade was first awarded with title Famous (Slavna) on the 15 April 1993 and later on the 29 June 1995 with title Knightly (Viteška). The first commander of the brigade was Atif Dudaković, who later became the commander of the 5th Corps. While Hamdija Abdić was the commander at the end of the war.

== History ==
The 502nd Brigade made a significant contribution to the defense of the Bihać Pocket. It especially stood out in the battles at Grabež, Plješevica and in the liberation operations of Bosnian Krajina. Its soldiers, despite their often poor equipment, showed excellent combat readiness and devotion to the goal of a free and complete Bosnia and Herzegovina. The fighters of this brigade were easily recognized by their affiliation with the ‘Tigrovi’ military unit, which was formed in October 1992 under the command of Hamdija Abdić. The most intense battles of the brigade were during 1992–1993, the battles were fought on the Grabež plateau, village Orljani and Lohovska Brda. In Lohovska Brda, the fighters of that brigade captured the first cannons of the war. The brigade especially stood out in reconnaissance, sabotage operations, fast movement and maneuver. The most important achievement of the brigade was the "Operation Tiger (1994)" which was a big success for the whole brigade and the Bosnian Army because it led to the abolition of the Autonomous Province of Western Bosnia. This success earned the brigade the nickname "Tigrovi". The name of the brigade was changed on the 1.4.1993 from Second Bihać Muslim-Croat Infantry Brigade to 502nd Mountain Brigade, Vlado Šantić as the Deputy Commander detached the Croatian battalion on the 11.11.1992 and formed the 101. bojna HVO Bihać brigade.

=== Operation Grmeč ===
On 25 October the 502nd Brigade together with other brigades of the 5th Corps captured the Grabež barrack and much of the long-contested Grabež plateau east of Bihać. On the second day of the offensive the 502nd Brigade together with the 501st Brigade launched an attack and liberated over a hundred square kilometers of territory while sending their elite "Tajfun" and "Tiger" Assault/Reconsabotage Battalions plunging into the VRS 2nd Krajina Corps rear.

== Organization ==
On the day of the formation the brigade had: 83 officers, 120 non-commissioned officers, 1136 soldiers and consisted of 3 infantry battalions which were:

- 1. Croatian battalion
- 2. Detachment TO Vrsta
- 3. Detachment TO Prekounje

After the reorganisation, brigade consisted of four battalions and one Reconnaissance-Sabotage Company Tigers. Brigade also included the logistics, military police, fire support battalion and main command. Croat battalion left the brigade shortly after formation in 1992, forming what is known as 101st Bojna (battalion sized). Forming the autonomous HVO forces in Bihać pocket. Some of the members refused to leave the 502nd Brigade, mainly the Croats that were neighbours of Bosniak members.

The primary area of responsibility of the brigade extended from Tržačka Raštela to Dobrenica and from Ribići to Pritočki Grabež. Since the formation of the Autonomous Province of Western Bosnia the area of responsibility toward those forces was south of Pećigrad. Brigade mostly operated around Bihać.

== Command ==
On the day of the formation of the brigade, it was structured like this:

- Commander: Atif Dudaković
- Deputy Commander: Vlado Šantič
- Assistant for Morale: Alaga Ajdinović
- Assistant for Security: Adem Šehić
- Assistant for Logistics: Filip Galić

Throughout the war other than Atif Dudaković, the command of the brigade was held by Aleksandar Mrenica, Sead Toromanović, Ekrem Karabegović and Hamdija Abdić "Tigar" who remained in that position until the war ended.

== Losses and decorations ==
The 502nd Brigade had 317 dead, 1694 wounded and 309 missing / captured fighters and elders from 1992 to 1995. Brigade earned both of the decorative titles. First the title Slavna (Famous/Celebrated) and later the Viteška (Knightly) title. Between the population brigade earned a famous nickname "Legendarna druga" (Legendary second). Commander of the Odred TO Vrsta what later became the 2nd Mountainous battalion, Major Adil Bešić earned the highest award Order of Hero of the Liberation war posthumously. Commanders Salih Dizdarić and Sidik Smlatić earned the Order of Golden Crest with Swords, both posthumously. Mirsad Litrić earned a Medal for bravery. Twenty soldiers are "Zlatni Ljiljani" – recipients of the Order of the Golden Lily.
