= Operation Breza '94 =

Military operation during the Bosnian War

Operation "Breza '94"
- Part of the Bosnian War
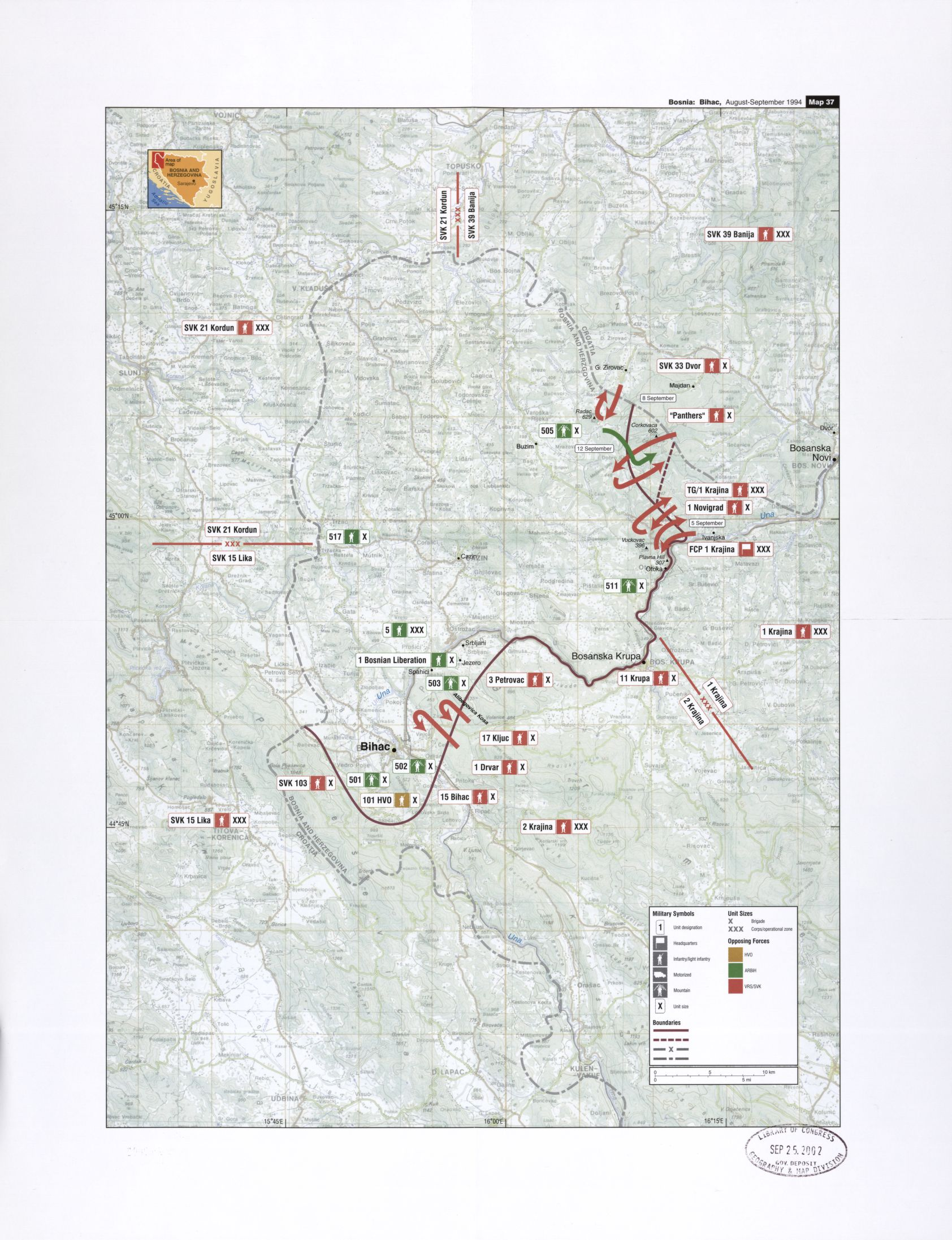
- Analysis of Operation Breza
Date	4–12 September 1994
Location	Western Bosnia and Herzegovina
Result	ARBiH victory: Repulsion of the VRS offensive; Recapture of approximately 20 km² of territory

Belligerents
Bosnia and Herzegovina	Republika Srpska; Serbian Krajina

Commanders and leaders
Atif Dudaković; Izet Nanić; Jasmin Kulenović	Ratko Mladić; Ljubiša Savić; Momir Talić; Grujo Borić

Units involved
Army of the Republic of Bosnia and Herzegovina; 5th Corps; 501st Bihać Mountain Brigade; 502nd Bihać Mountain Brigade; 503rd Cazin Mountain Brigade; 505th Bužim Brigade; 511th Bosanska Krupa Mountain Brigade; 1st Bosnian Liberation Brigade	Army of Republika Srpska; 1st Krajina Corps; 1st Krajina Brigade; 2nd Krajina Brigade; 2nd Krajina Corps; Garda Panteri; Army of Serbian Krajina; 39th Banija Corps; 33rd Dvor Brigade

Strength
15,000 soldiers	13,000 soldiers

Casualties and losses
31 soldiers killed	70 soldiers killed 10 soldiers captured

Operation "Breza 94" was the military offensive conducted by the 1st Krajina Corps of the Army of Republika Srpska (VRS) in September 1994 in Bosanska Krajina during the Bosnian War. The objective of the offensive was the breaking of the 5th Corps of the Army of the Republic of Bosnia and Herzegovina (ARBiH) and the conquest of Bosanska Krajina. The offensive ended in VRS defeat with the ARBiH capturing 20 square kilometers previously held by Serbs. The failure of the operation exposed significant systemic weaknesses in VRS logistics and discipline, serving as a catalyst for the 5th Corps' transition to an offensive posture that shifted the strategic initiative in the region in favor of the ARBiH.

== Background ==
By the summer of 1994, the Bihać pocket was one of the most contested areas of the Bosnian War. Following the defeat of the National Defence forces led by Fikret Abdić, the ARBiH 5th Corps had successfully consolidated its lines, reducing the number of active combat axes it had to defend from three to two. This consolidation freed up critical reserves, allowing General Atif Dudaković to focus his defenses against the surrounding Army of Republika Srpska (VRS) and Serbian Army of Krajina (SVK) forces.

== Planning and Objectives ==
In August 1994, the VRS Main Staff, seeking a decisive victory to break the backbone of the 5th Corps, authorized the planning of Operation Breza '94. The radical strategic objective was the total defeat of the 5th Corps and the conquest of the Bihać pocket. The operation relied on a two-pronged offensive: the 2nd Krajina Corps was tasked with a main strike to capture the Grabež plateau from the south, while the 1st Krajina Corps initiated a diversionary attack along the Una River toward Bosanska Otoka.

The offensive was conducted under the direct supervision of Ratko Mladić, who aimed to split the enclave in two and link up with other forces within 15 days. Despite these ambitious goals, the operation faced immediate challenges; the Serb forces were already suffering from fatigue following months of continuous combat and were hampered by critical shortages in fuel and ammunition. The offensive plan involved approximately 5,000 to 5,500 troops attacking the Grabež plateau, composed of the 1st Drvar, 3rd Petrovac, and 17th Ključ Light Infantry Brigades, supported by the 15th Bihać Infantry Brigade.

The 1st Krajina Corps' role was managed via two tactical groups: the first, consisting of one battalion each from the 5th Kozarska, 6th Sana, and 43rd Prijedor Brigades, was tasked with the capture of Otoka; the second, featuring the Garda Panteri special brigade, the 1st Military Police Battalion, and the 1st Krajina Brigade Reconnaissance Squadron, was assigned to capture Bužim and Cazin. Fire support was provided by the 1st Novigrad Brigade and the 33rd Dvor Brigade of the Serbian Army of Krajina. To hold these lines, the ARBiH deployed the 501st, 502nd, 503rd, and 1st Bosnian Liberation brigades around Grabež, while the 505th Bužim and 511th Bosanska Krupa brigades covered the Bužim and Otoka sectors, bringing the total 5th Corps strength to approximately 15,000 soldiers. Before the battle, Mladić outlined the operation's objectives in a recorded statement, saying that the forces deployed in the area were "the best that the Serbian army has" and that they had to enter Bužim within seven days, "break the backbone of the 5th Corps", link up with other forces within fifteen days, and occupy the Bihać pocket.

== Operations ==
=== Battle for Grabez Plateau ===
The 2nd Krajina Corps, commanded by Grujo Borić, launched its offensive on 31 August toward the Grabež plateau, with the initial objectives of capturing Alibegovića Kosa and Barakovac Hill. Although the VRS made initial progress, the 5th Corps defensive line remained intact. On 6 September, the 503rd Mountain Brigade launched a counterattack that nullified the VRS gains and resulted in the capture of several positions previously held by Serb forces.

=== Battle for Buzim-Otoka ===
The offensive was commanded by Lieutenant General Momir Talić of the 1st Krajina Corps, under the direct supervision of Ratko Mladić. The 1st Krajina Brigade launched an assault along a 10-kilometer front toward Bosanska Otoka, forcing the 511th Mountain Brigade to withdraw. By 9 September, having crossed the Baštra River, the brigade had advanced to within one kilometer of the town. Despite a four-day offensive, they failed to capture Bosanska Otoka. Simultaneously, the Garda Panteri special brigade initiated an assault on Bužim on 8 September, supported by a tank company. They advanced two kilometers into Bosnian territory, encountering forces commanded by Izet Nanić. Despite intensive artillery support from the SVK, the unit achieved only minimal territorial gains. On 12 September, as the "Panthers" renewed their advance, the 5th Corps launched a coordinated counterattack. Elements of the 505th Brigade, specifically the elite "Hamze" and "Gazije" units, were supported by reconnaissance-sabotage elements from the 502nd and 517th brigades. The ARBiH successfully infiltrated SVK lines and struck the "Panthers" in their flank. Following this, the "Panthers" and the 33rd Dvor Brigade withdrew, leading to the collapse of the offensive.

== Aftermath ==
Following the operation, the ARBiH seized a significant amount of military equipment, including one T-55 tank, three 120 mm mortars, one ZiS anti-tank gun, various anti-aircraft artillery (PAT) and anti-tank recoilless guns (BST), five TAM 110 motor vehicles, one Puch, an ambulance, and Strela anti-aircraft missiles, as well as significant quantities of ammunition of various calibers. Notably, the famous VRS tank "Siva munja" ("Grey Lightning"), which had seen service on various battlefields throughout the Bosnian War, was destroyed. The offensive resulted in approximately 100 wounded and 10 deaths among the Bosniak civilian population.

The decisive repulsion of the VRS offensive during Operation Breza '94 served as the catalyst for the 5th Corps to transition from a defensive posture to an offensive one. Emboldened by this victory, the 5th Corps successfully shifted the strategic initiative in the region, directly facilitating the launch of the Grmeč-94 counter-offensive in late October 1994.

== Sources ==
- Central Intelligence Agency, Office of Russian and European Analysis (2002). Balkan Battlegrounds: A Military History of the Yugoslav Conflict, 1990–1995. Washington, D.C.: Central Intelligence Agency. ISBN 978-0160664724. OCLC 50396958.
- Viktor Bezruchenko (2022). The Civil War in Bosnia and Herzegovina (1992-95): Political, Military, and Diplomatic History. Houston, TX: Strategic Book Publishing. ISBN 978-1682357125.
- Jusić, Sead (2019). Breza-94: Bužimska bosanska bitka. Udruženje 505. viteška bužimska. ISBN 9789926838300.
- Felić, Bejdo (1995). Peti korpus (1992–1995). Ljiljan. ISBN 9958-22-098-9.
- Jašarević, Senudin (1997). Treći rat: Peti korpus protiv autonomije. NIP Unsko-sanske novine.
