= Izet Nanić =

Bosnian brigade commander (1965–1995)

- Born: 4 October 1965; Bužim, SR Bosnia and Herzegovina, SFR Yugoslavia
- Died: 5 August 1995 (aged 29); Ćorkovača near Bužim, Bosnia and Herzegovina
- Education: Yugoslav Military Academy
- Spouse: Safija Remetić
- Children: 3
- Military career
- Allegiance: (Socialist Federal Republic of Yugoslavia) SFR Yugoslavia Republic of Bosnia and Herzegovina
- Branch: Yugoslav Air Force Army of the Republic of Bosnia and Herzegovina
- Service years: 1984–1995
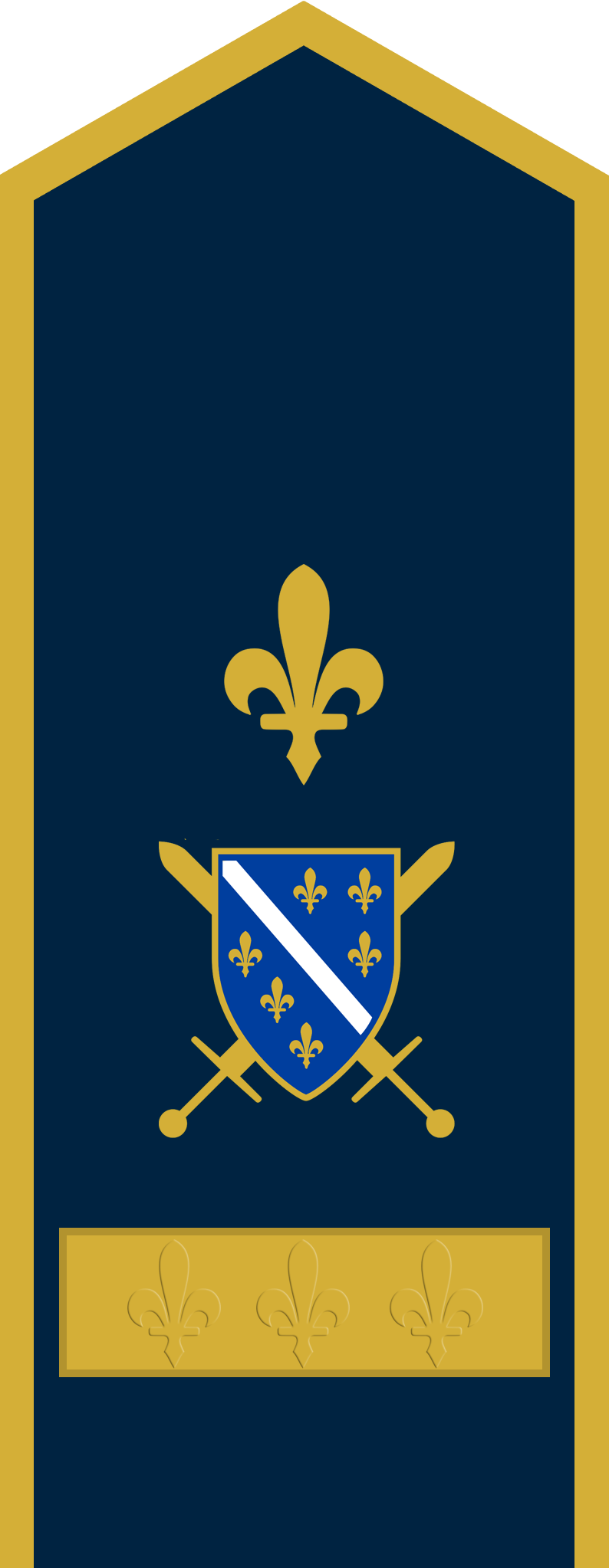
- Rank: Brigadier general
- Nickname: Igman
- Units: Territorial Defence Bužim; 505th Bužim Brigade
- Conflicts: Bosnian War; Siege of Bihać (1992–95); Operation Oganj '92; Operation Munja '93; Operation Breza '94; Operation Tiger (1994); Operation Shield '94; Operation Spider; Operation Triangle I; Operation Sword–1; Operation Storm †
- Awards: Order of the Golden Lily (1994) Order of the Hero of the Liberation War (1998)

Izet Nanić (4 October 1965 – 5 August 1995) was a Bosnian military officer who served as a brigade commander in the Army of the Republic of Bosnia and Herzegovina (ARBiH) during the Bosnian War. As the long-standing commander of the 505th Bužim Brigade, Nanić became one of the most prominent figures of the 5th Corps, playing a pivotal role in the defense of the Bihać enclave against forces of the Army of Republika Srpska (VRS) and the Autonomous Province of Western Bosnia.

Known for his tactical acumen and leadership of his unit—which gained a reputation as one of the ARBiH's most effective and disciplined formations—Nanić commanded his brigade through several critical operations, including Operation Munja '93, Operation Breza '94, and the final offensives of 1995. Nanić was killed in action during Operation Storm in August 1995, just months before the conclusion of the war. Posthumously, he was awarded the Order of the Hero of the Liberation War, the highest military decoration in Bosnia and Herzegovina, and he remains a central figure in the collective memory of the Bosniaks as a symbol of the resistance in the Una-Sana Canton.

== Family ==
A Bosniak, Izet Nanić was born to Ibrahim Nanić (1939–2000) and Rasima (born 1945) in the town of Bužim, as second of seven children.

He was married to Safija Remetić, from Varoška Rijeka. Together they had three children: a daughter and two sons.

== Career ==
Nanić finished the military gymnasium in 1984, in Zagreb and then went to Belgrade after being accepted in the military academy there. After being in the military academy for two years, he went to Sarajevo for 1 year. Then he went back to Zagreb again in 1987 where he finished his military academy training.

Until January 1991, Nanić was an officer of the Yugoslav People's Army, when he returned to his home in Bužim due to a broken leg. He was a lieutenant of the Yugoslav Air Force and anti-aircraft defence in Kragujevac, Serbia. At the beginning of Bosnian War, he joined the Army of the Republic of Bosnia and Herzegovina. His younger brother Nevzet was killed near Bosanska Krupa on 30 June 1992, shortly after the start of the war in Bosnia. Initially Nanić was involved in training and forming new units however after his brother's death he became the commander of the 505th Brigade of the 5th Corps led by Brigadier General Atif Dudaković. He led the command from its creation in 1992 to his death. Izet Nanić was killed during Operation Storm on 5 August 1995 four months before the Dayton Agreement and the end of the Bosnian war.

== Legacy ==
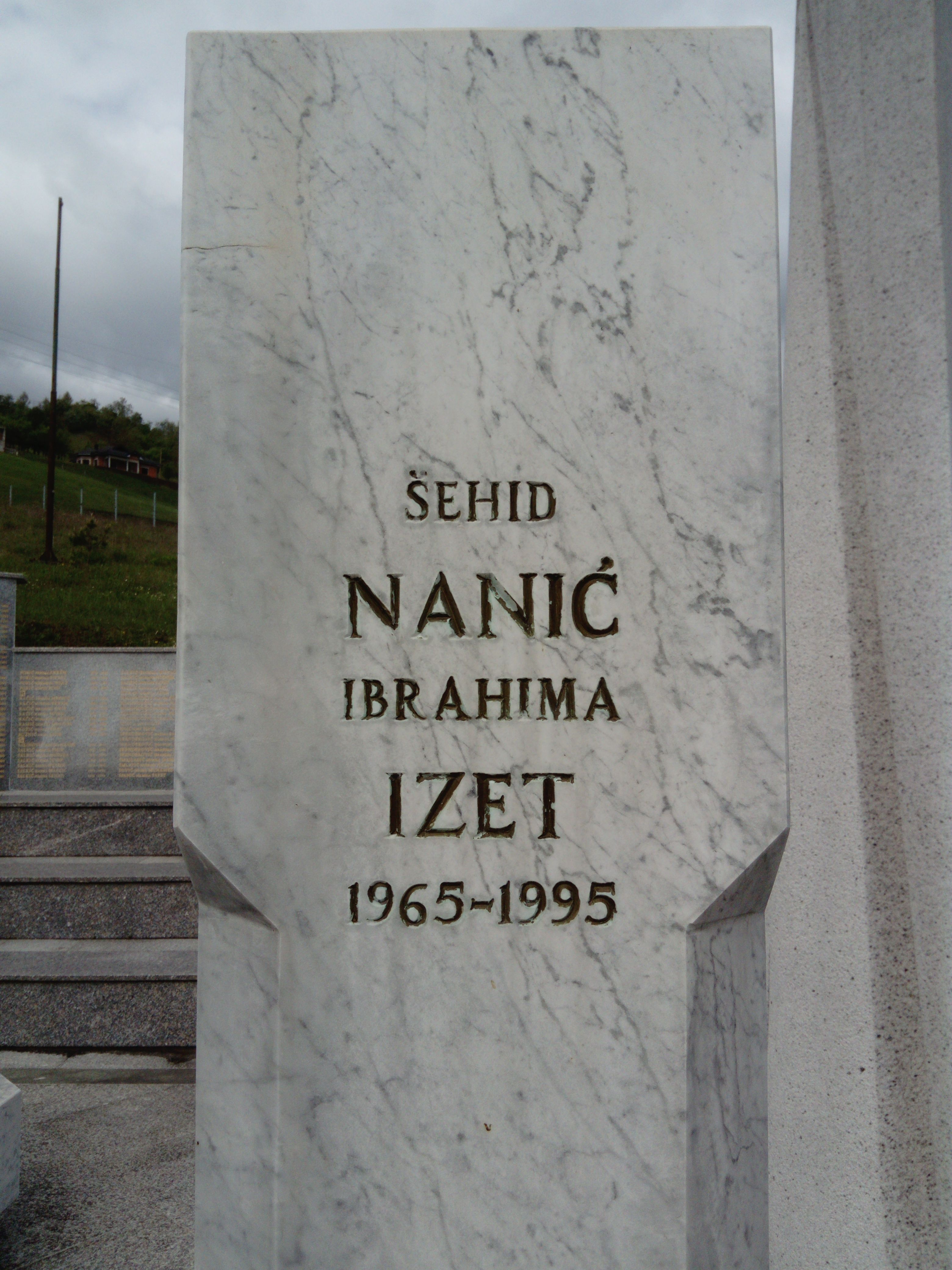
Grave of Izet Nanić

Bosniaks see Nanić as a legendary commander, as his brigade liberated and brought under Bosniak control, several cities and towns, including Velika Kladuša in Operation Tiger and Sanski Most, Bosanska Krupa, Bosanski Petrovac and Ključ in Operation Sana. In 1994 Nanić was awarded the Order of the Golden Lily and in 1998 posthumously the Order of the Hero of the Liberation War, the latter being the highest honorary title that was awarded by the Army of the Republic of Bosnia and Herzegovina.

In Sarajevo's Hrasnica neighborhood, within the Ilidža municipality, lies "General Izet Nanić" Street (Bosnian: Ulica Generala Izeta Nanića), situated just below Mount Igman, a nod to his codename "Igman." Similar streets bearing his name are found in his hometown of Bužim, near the mausoleum shared with his brother, in Cazin, Sanski Most and Bosanska Krupa. Additionally, a street in Ključ (Bosnian: Ulica Izeta Nanića), lacks the prefix "general."
