= Operation Una =

Military offensive by the Croatian Army against the Army of Republika Srpska

Coordinates: 45.179912°N 16.801419°E

- Part of the Bosnian War and the Croatian War of Independence
- Objectives of Operation Una on the map of Bosnia and Herzegovina
| Date | 18–19 September 1995 |
| Location | Western Bosnia and Herzegovina |
| Result | Army of Republika Srpska victory: Croatian army operation aborted; Advance towards Banja Luka is prevented |
| Territorial changes | Republika Srpska retains control over Bosanska Kostajnica, Novi Grad and Bosanska Dubica |

Belligerents
| Croatia | (Republika Srpska (1992–1995)) Republika Srpska |

Commanders and leaders
| (Croatia) Franjo Tudjman (Croatia) Vinko Vrbanac (Croatia) Marijan Mareković (Croatia) Luka Džanko (Croatia) Nenad Babić † | (Republika Srpska) Momir Talić |

Units involved
| Croatian Army; 1st Guards Brigade; 2nd Guards Brigade; 52nd Daruvar Home Guard Regiment; 34th Engineer Battalion | Army of Republika Srpska; 1st Krajina Corps; 1st Novigrad Infantry Brigade; 1st Gradiška Light Infantry Brigade; 11th Dubica Infantry Brigade; Serb Volunteer Guard; Serbian Army of Krajina; Special units of the SVK |

Strength
| 6,400 troops | 10,000 troops |

Casualties and losses
| 49–70 killed^{a} 250 wounded | c. 50 killed 62 wounded 3 captured |
- (Republika Srpska) 54 Serb civilians killed, 39 wounded and 6 captured (United Nations) 2 UNCRO peacekeepers killed in the VRS shelling of Dvor
- a After the war, Croatian General Janko Bobetko estimated Croatian losses as 70 killed and 250 wounded, though Croatian Government statistics contradict his claim.

Operation Una (Croatian: Operacija Una) was a military offensive conducted by the Croatian Army (Hrvatska vojska – HV) against the Army of Republika Srpska (Vojska Republike Srpske – VRS) in western Bosnia and Herzegovina on 18–19 September 1995, during the Bosnian War. The operation entailed a crossing of the Una and Sava rivers to establish bridgeheads at Novi Grad, Bosanska Dubica, Bosanska Kostajnica and opposite Jasenovac to allow for a subsequent advance towards Prijedor and Banja Luka.

The operation was planned in a matter of hours following a meeting between Croatian President Franjo Tuđman and U.S. diplomat Richard Holbrooke, during which Holbrooke urged Tuđman to seize Prijedor and threaten to capture Banja Luka from the VRS, short of actually seizing the city, as he believed such a development would force Bosnian Serb leaders to the negotiating table. Inadequate planning and preparation, combined with flawed military intelligence on the defending force and disregard for the high water level of the Una and Sava rivers, led to a high number of casualties and little success. The offensive was called off one day after it was launched and the bridgeheads were evacuated. The HV ultimately blamed Major General Vinko Vrbanac for its failure. Vrbanac had authorized the offensive instead of deferring to the Chief of the General Staff General Zvonimir Červenko.

Operation Una was the only unsuccessful operation by the HV from a series of offensives which had commenced in November 1994. It was controversial in the Croatian media, but was generally brushed aside as an aberration from a series of successes. In 2006, Croatian authorities launched an investigation into alleged war crimes committed by HV soldiers during the operation, in which 40 Serb civilians were killed.

== Background ==
As the Yugoslav People's Army (Jugoslovenska narodna armija – JNA) withdrew from Croatia following the acceptance and start of implementation of the Vance plan, its 55,000 officers and soldiers born in Bosnia and Herzegovina were transferred to a new Bosnian Serb army, which was later renamed the Army of Republika Srpska (Vojska Republike Srpske – VRS). This re-organisation followed the declaration of the Serbian Republic of Bosnia and Herzegovina on 9 January 1992, ahead of the referendum on the independence of Bosnia and Herzegovina that took place between 29 February and 1 March 1992. This declaration would later be cited by the Bosnian Serbs as a pretext for the Bosnian War. Bosnian Serbs began fortifying the capital, Sarajevo, and other areas on 1 March 1992. On the following day, the first fatalities of the war were recorded in Sarajevo and Doboj. In the final days of March, Bosnian Serb forces bombarded Bosanski Brod with artillery, resulting in a cross-border operation by the Croatian Army (Hrvatska vojska – HV) 108th Brigade. On 4 April 1992, JNA artillery began shelling Sarajevo. There were other examples of the JNA directly supported the VRS, such as during the capture of Zvornik in early April 1992, when the JNA provided artillery support from Serbia, firing across the Drina River. At the same time, the JNA attempted to defuse the situation and arrange negotiations elsewhere in the country.

The JNA and the VRS in Bosnia and Herzegovina faced the Army of the Republic of Bosnia and Herzegovina (Armija Republike Bosne i Hercegovine – ARBiH) and the Croatian Defence Council (Hrvatsko vijeće obrane – HVO), reporting to the Bosniak-dominated central government and the Bosnian Croat leadership respectively, as well as the HV, which occasionally supported HVO operations. In late April, the VRS was able to deploy 200,000 troops, hundreds of tanks, armoured personnel carriers (APCs) and artillery pieces. The HVO and the Croatian Defence Forces (Hrvatske obrambene snage – HOS) could field approximately 25,000 soldiers and a handful of heavy weapons, while the ARBiH was largely unprepared with nearly 100,000 troops, small arms for less than a half of their number and virtually no heavy weapons. Arming of the various forces was hampered by a United Nations (UN) arms embargo introduced in September 1991. By mid-May 1992, when those JNA units which had not been transferred to the VRS withdrew from Bosnia and Herzegovina to the newly declared Federal Republic of Yugoslavia, the VRS controlled approximately 60 percent of Bosnia and Herzegovina. The extent of the control was extended to about 70 percent of the country by the end of the year.

== Prelude ==
By 1995, the ARBiH and the HVO had developed into better-organised forces employing comparably large numbers of artillery pieces and good defensive fortifications. The VRS was not capable of penetrating their defences even where its forces employed sound military tactics, for instance in the Battle of Orašje in May and June 1995. After recapture of the bulk of the Republic of Serbian Krajina (the Croatian Serb-controlled areas of Croatia) in Operation Storm in August 1995, the HV shifted its focus to western Bosnia and Herzegovina. The shift was motivated by a desire to create a security zone along the Croatian border, establish Croatia as a regional power and gain favours with the West by forcing an end to the Bosnian War. The government of Bosnia and Herzegovina welcomed the move as it contributed to their goal of gaining control over western Bosnia and the city of Banja Luka—the largest city in the Bosnian Serb-held territory.

While NATO launched Operation Deliberate Force—a series of airstrikes that generally targeted the VRS around Sarajevo, western Bosnia remained relatively calm following Operation Storm, with the exception of probing attacks launched by the VRS, HVO or ARBiH near Bihać, Drvar and Glamoč. At the time the HV, HVO and ARBiH were planning a joint offensive in the region. The HV and HVO component of the offensive, codenamed Operation Maestral 2, was launched on 8 September with the aim of capturing the towns of Jajce, Šipovo and Drvar. On 13 September, as NATO airstrikes ceased, and the HV and HVO neared the completion of their objectives, the ARBiH 5th Corps launched Operation Sana, pushing the VRS southeast from Bihać by up to 70 kilometres (43 miles) and widening the salient held by the ARBiH north towards Novi Grad.

On 17 September, U.S. diplomat Richard Holbrooke and U.S. Ambassador to Croatia Peter W. Galbraith met with Croatian President Franjo Tuđman in Zagreb. Holbrooke was directed by the United States to urge Tuđman to stop offensive operations by the HV in western Bosnia and Herzegovina. However, Holbrooke and Galbraith thought the instructions unwise and saw the opportunity to defeat the VRS and establish a new military balance in the country. Holbrooke also considered that the changing situation on the ground allowed him and Galbraith to ignore the instructions. Holbrooke urged Tuđman to capture Sanski Most, Novi Grad and Prijedor from the VRS, and to do so quickly, but asked him to stop short of capturing Banja Luka. Holbrooke and Galbraith considered it would be advantageous for them and that justice would be served if the VRS lost Banja Luka, but decided against encouraging it, fearing there would be another 200,000 refugees from the city or that Croatia would not be willing to relinquish control of Banja Luka later on. They were also hoping that more moderate Bosnian Serb leadership might be found in the city, as it was the most urban Bosnian Serb area.

== Order of battle ==
Based on the outcome of the Holbrooke–Tuđman meeting and the assessment of the HV General Staff that the VRS 2nd Corps was completely destroyed, a decision was made to deploy the HV to the area with virtually no preparation and planning. The assessment of the HV General Staff was based on ARBiH gains in western Bosnia and Herzegovina over the previous four days. The order to attack was drawn up on 17 September and signed by Major General Vinko Vrbanac on behalf of the Chief of the General Staff, General Zvonimir Červenko. The attack, codenamed Operation Una, was to commence with crossings of the Una River at Novi Grad and Bosanska Dubica, and the Sava River at Jasenovac, followed by the seizing of Mount Prosara to allow for further advances towards Prijedor. The operation was intended to be coordinated with the ARBiH 5th Corps, which would continue its rapid advance towards Prijedor and Novi Grad.

The orders only gave the HV approximately 10 hours to prepare, so only those HV elements already deployed in the vicinity of the planned bridgeheads were committed to the attack—drawn from the Zagreb Corps along the Una and the Bjelovar Corps along the Sava. The Una crossings were considered the primary objectives, and were assigned to elements of the 1st Guards and 2nd Guards brigades supported by the 17th Home Guard Regiment. The two guards brigades combined had 1,500 troops, with a further 1,500 reserve infantry of the Home Guard, available for the crossing of the Una. The Bjelovar Corps had approximately 2,500 Home Guard reserve infantry at its disposal, distributed in three battlegroups (consisting of elements of the 52nd, 121st and 125th Home Guard regiments) and about 900 support troops, including a battalion of 155-millimetre (6.1 in) guns from the 16th Artillery-Rocket Brigade, and elements of the 18th Artillery Battalion (a platoon each of 155-millimetre howitzers and 130-millimetre (5.1 in) guns). The Bjelovar Corps force was commanded by Major General Luka Džanko, while the Zagreb Corps units committed to the operation were led by Major General Marijan Mareković.

The VRS had three garrison battalions in the area, generally manned by over-aged reservists. Two of them, those belonging to the 1st Novigrad Infantry Brigade and the 11th Dubica Infantry Brigade, were deployed along the Una River and faced the Zagreb Corps. The remaining one, part of the 1st Gradiška Light Infantry Brigade, was deployed along the Sava River opposite the HV Bjelovar Corps. The VRS defenders, under the overall control of the 1st Krajina Corps commanded by Lieutenant Colonel General Momir Talić, were deployed in prepared fortifications protected by minefields and strong artillery fire support. The HV estimated that the VRS units deployed along the Sava River were supported by a company of tanks and one battery each of 130-millimetre guns, 155-millimetre howitzers and 76-millimetre (3.0 in) antitank guns.

HV order of battle
| Corps | Unit | Notes |
|---|---|---|
| Zagreb | 1st Guards Brigade | In the area of Dvor |
| Zagreb | 2nd Guards Brigade | In the area of Hrvatska Dubica |
| Zagreb | 17th Home Guard Regiment | In the area of Hrvatska Dubica |
| Zagreb | General Staff Reconnaissance Sabotage Company | In Hrvatska Kostajnica |
| Bjelovar | 52nd Home Guard Regiment | In Jasenovac area, a battlegroup of 770 troops |
| Bjelovar | 121st Home Guard Regiment | In Jasenovac area, a battlegroup of 911 troops |
| Bjelovar | 125th Home Guard Regiment | In Jasenovac area, a battlegroup of 800 troops |
| Bjelovar | 16th Artillery-Rocket Brigade | One battalion of 155-millimetre (6.1 in) howitzers only, 237 troops |
| Bjelovar | 18th Artillery Battalion | A platoon of 155-millimetre howitzers and a platoon of 130-millimetre (5.1 in) gun, 106 troops |
| Bjelovar | 34th Engineer Battalion | Also utilising equipment of the 33rd Engineer Battalion |
| Bjelovar | 69th Military Police Company | |

VRS order of battle
| Area | Unit | Notes |
|---|---|---|
| Una River | 1st Novi Grad Infantry Brigade | Part of the 1st Krajina Corps; Only one garrison battalion of reserve infantry from each of the brigades, supported by artillery and fortifications |
| Una River | 11th Dubica Infantry Brigade | Part of the 1st Krajina Corps; Only one garrison battalion of reserve infantry from each of the brigades, supported by artillery and fortifications |
| Sava River | 1st Gradiška Light Infantry Brigade | Part of the 1st Krajina Corps; Only one garrison battalion of reserve infantry from each of the brigades, supported by artillery and fortifications |

== Timeline ==
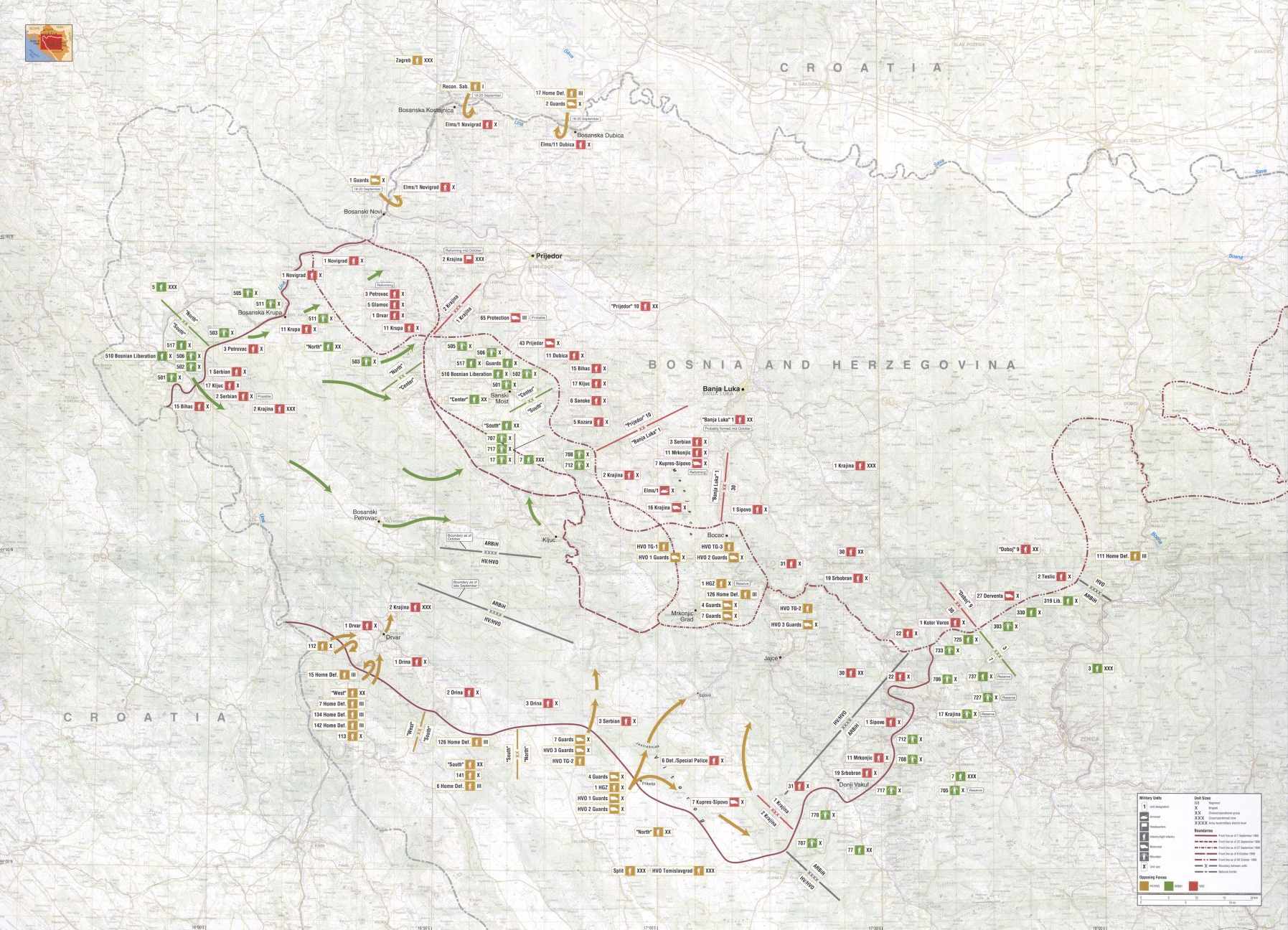
Map of battles in western Bosnia in September–October 1995; Operation Una is depicted near the top of the map

=== 18 September ===
The crossings were hampered by the high level of the rivers, flooding of foreshores, strong currents and floating debris, as well as a shortage of boats and other means of river crossing. The equipment provided by the 33rd Engineer Battalion, including two tugboats and an amphibious vehicle, was late in arriving and did not reach the combat zone until noon on 18 September. All along the 100-kilometre (62 mi) course of the Una and Sava rivers where the offensive was to take place, the HV began artillery bombardment at noon, and crossings followed after 15:00 hours. The 125th Home Guard Regiment battlegroup attempted a crossing near the village of Košutarica, but failed after encountering strong small arms and mortar fire. The 52nd Home Guard Regiment battlegroup's attempt to cross the Sava downstream of Jasenovac likewise failed, deterred by strong mortar fire. The Zagreb Corps units managed to establish small bridgeheads in their designated landing zones in Novi Grad, Bosanska Kostajnica and Bosanska Dubica, but were pinned down by artillery and machine gun fire. As the HV had suffered 27 dead in the first few hours of combat, Vrbanac was sent to inspect the situation and he was appalled by the poor organization of the assault. During the night of 18/19 September, VRS artillery continued to shell HV positions along the rivers, but also fired on the towns of Novska, Kutina, Nova Gradiška, and Dvor.

The ARBiH drive towards Sanski Most and Novi Grad, where one of the bridgeheads had been established by the HV, came to a halt on 18–19 September, as the ARBiH encountered 14,000 previously undetected VRS troops in the area, supported by 2,000 troops that had arrived from Serbia.

=== 19 September ===
Even though Vrbanac ordered a halt to the operation shortly after midnight on 18/19 September, the Bjelovar Corps failed to cancel new crossing attempts it had ordered for 6:00 the following morning. The attacks went ahead, albeit at 10:30, with the 52nd and the 125th Home Guard regiments' battlegroups trying to cross the Sava River at different locations. Despite strengthening river currents and continued VRS artillery fire, small reconnaissance elements managed to cross the river, only to be forced back an hour later.

At 12:50, a force comprising elements of the 121st and 125th Home Guard regiments and the 265th Reconnaissance-Sabotage Company managed to cross the Sava River at the confluence of the Sava and Una. The crossing force of 80 soldiers, encountered a minefield, VRS artillery fire and small arms fire from bunkers near the river bank. Extraction of the force began after 14:00, leading to an exchange of heavy artillery fire between the VRS on one bank and the 121st and the 125th Home Guard regiments' battlegroups on the other. The withdrawal required several river crossings using the available boats, and resulted in further losses. The situation was further complicated for the HV but a number of incidents and factors. These included a tugboat towing a damaged amphibious vehicle which caught fire because of faulty wiring, insufficient fire support from river gunboats, and boat crews provided by the 34th Engineer Battalion who refused to cross the river against VRS fire and had to be replaced by conscripts of the 33rd Engineer Battalion. Despite HV use of unmanned aerial vehicles to locate the VRS guns as targets for counter-battery fire, the artillery exchange continued late into the night of 19/20 September.

The 52nd Home Guard Regiment battlegroup crossed the Sava River again at 14:30 to support the extraction of the bridgehead established by the elements of the 121st and the 125th Home Guard regiments. That crossing involved 91 soldiers who advanced about 900 metres (3,000 feet) and destroyed several VRS defensive positions before withdrawing at 16:30.

On 19 September, the Zagreb Corps tried to reinforce the HV bridgeheads across the Una River, only to suffer further casualties. The Bjelovar Corps also committed the 121st Home Guard Regiment battlegroup to Jasenovac as a reinforcement to breach VRS defences. During the day, the Bjelovar Corps was approached by Irfan Torić, the commanding officer of the 520th ARBiH Brigade based in Velika Kladuša, requesting permission to deploy his troops to support the Bjelovar Corps attack. Džanko referred the request to Červenko. By the end of the day, Červenko had met with Tuđman to protest against the disorganised manner in which the operation had been launched, and the fact that he was not informed of it in advance. On the same day, the HV General Staff called the operation off.

== Aftermath ==
After the war, General Janko Bobetko estimated HV losses at more than 70 killed and 250 wounded. According to official records, 49 HV soldiers were killed during the operation. Of the casualties, the Bjelovar Corps accounted for five dead and 26 wounded. According to Bosnian Serb sources, the VRS sustained 44 killed, 53 wounded and three captured. In addition, six Bosnian Serb police officers were killed and nine were wounded. Bosnian Serb sources hold that Serb civilian casualties were 54 killed, 39 wounded and 6 captured in the two days of the offensive. Two Danish peacekeepers, deployed with the United Nations Confidence Restoration Operation in Croatia (UNCRO), were killed in the VRS shelling of Dvor. In 2006, Croatian authorities began investigating allegations of war crimes committed during the operation, specifically the killing of 40 civilians in the Bosanska Dubica area by troops of the 1st Battalion of the 2nd Guards Brigade.

On 20 September 1995, Červenko submitted his report on Operation Una to Tuđman, divorcing responsibility from himself, and blaming Vrbanac and Defence Minister Gojko Šušak. The blame was subsequently placed on Vrbanac alone, ultimately ending his military career. Mareković, who was expected to succeed Červenko as the Chief of the General Staff, was passed over in favour of General Pavao Miljavac when Červenko retired in 1996.

The offensive was the only unsuccessful operation undertaken by the HV since Operation Winter '94 in November 1994, and was brushed aside in Croatia as an aberration. It still remained a subject of controversy in the Croatian media. According to Croatian historian Davor Marijan, the operation was primarily politically motivated and hastily launched in response to Holbrooke's remarks of 17 September. Nonetheless, Marijan claims that the attack was based on incorrect intelligence, leading to an underestimation of the VRS defenses by the HV. In addition, the HV overestimated its own capacity to execute a difficult operation, and neglected the condition of the rivers that they intended to cross. The HV never attempted to repeat the crossing, instead choosing to threaten Banja Luka from a different direction in early October in Operation Southern Move.
