= Operation Tiger (1994) =

Military action in Bosnia and Herzegovina

Operation Tiger '94
- Part of the Bosnian War and Inter-Bosnian Muslim War
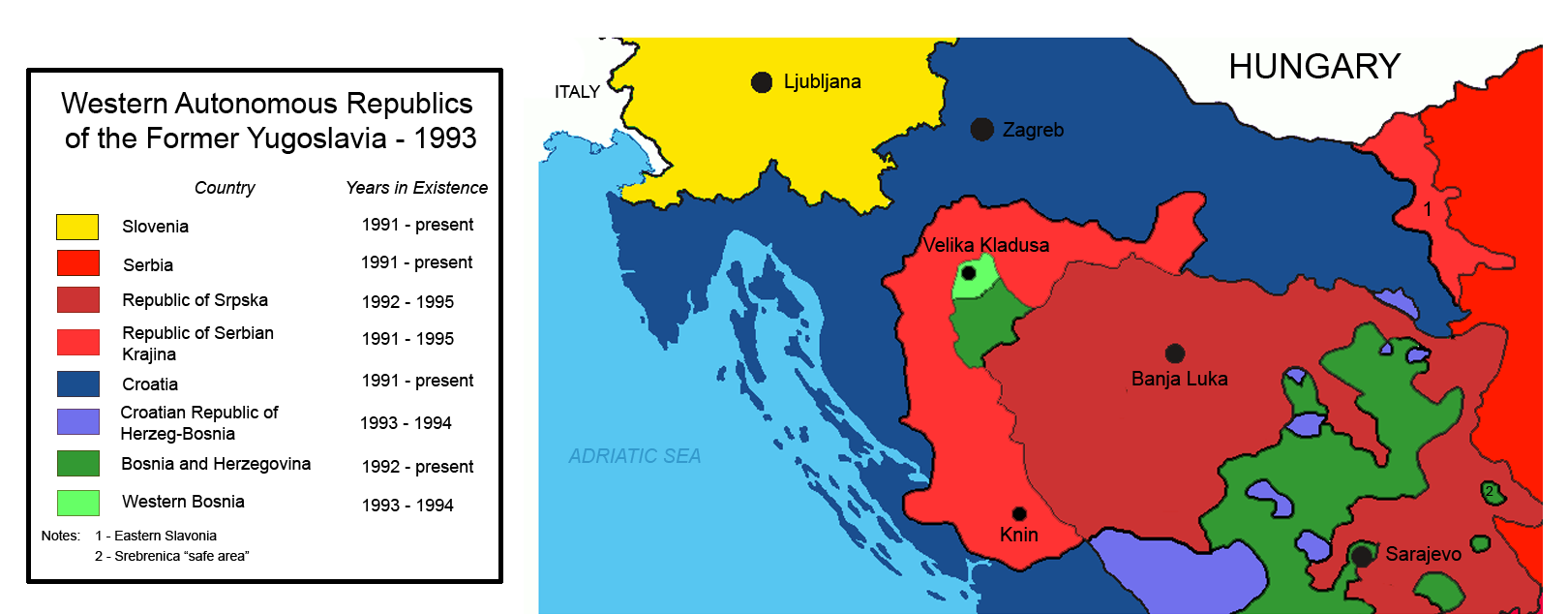
- Western Bosnia is the light green canton in the middle
Date	2 June – 21 August 1994
Location	Izačić, Bosnia and Herzegovina 44°52′N 15°47′E
Result	Central government victory: Serb forces pushed from Bihać; Autonomous Province of Western Bosnia abolished

Belligerents
Republic of Bosnia and Herzegovina	AP Western Bosnia

Commanders and leaders
Atif Dudaković; Izet Nanić; Hamdija Abdić	Fikret Abdić

Units involved
Army of the Republic of Bosnia and Herzegovina; 5th Corps; 502nd Bihać Mountain Brigade	National Defence of AP Western Bosnia

Strength
ARBIH: 10,000 soldiers	NOZB: 5,000 soldiers

Operation Tiger 94 (Serbo-Croatian: Operacija Tigar 94 or Operacija Tigar-Sloboda 94) was a military action in the summer of 1994, by the Army of the Republic of Bosnia and Herzegovina (ARBiH) against the Bosnian autonomous zone of the Autonomous Province of Western Bosnia, its leader Fikret Abdić and his Serbian backers the Army of the Republic of Serb Krajina (SVK), and the Army of Republika Srpska (VRS). The battle was a huge success for the ARBiH, which was able to rout Abdić's forces and occupy the territory of Western Bosnia. Fikret Abdić was able to recapture the territory in November 1994 in Operation Spider.

== Background ==
The early 1990s saw the existence of a western "Muslim" enclave held by Bosnian government forces under the leadership of the ARBiH commander, Atif Dudaković. The region was fortunate that even having some Croatian population in the southwest, it was able to avoid internecine fighting between the once-allied Croatian Defence Council (HVO) forces and government Bosnian ARBiH forces that plagued central Bosnia. This was however about the only thing the western enclave had in its favour.

In addition to being surrounded by Serbian forces with the Republic of Serbian Krajina to the west and the Bosnian Republika Srpska (VRS) to the east, the Western enclave forces had to deal with the Autonomous Province of Western Bosnia and its leader Fikret Abdić.

The Autonomous Province of Western Bosnia operated as a de facto independent mini-state complete with a prime minister and a parliament, existing in the Western enclave between 1993 and 1995 with its capital at Velika Kladuša. In 1993 Fikret Abdić, once the president of the Agrokomerc company, carved out this entity by recruiting followers through Serbian arms, military training, and propaganda techniques, while the broader population of Bosnian Muslims from Bihać firmly opposed the autonomy and maintained loyalty to the central government line in Sarajevo. Residents of Velika Kladusa were reported as treating Abdić with excessive reference and "were ready to do whatever he said."

Talking to his autonomist followers was much the same as speaking with cult converts anywhere in the world: a wooden dead-end dialogue hallmarked by the absence of individual rationale and logic.
— Anthony Loyd

Even though it was surrounded by Serbian forces and constantly harassed by Abdić's followers, the western enclave protected by the 5th Corps of the Army of the Republic of Bosnia and Herzegovina (five infantry brigades strong) was able to hold its own and achieve some success partly thanks to the leadership of Atif Dudaković. By the summer of 1994, Dudaković had developed a plan in hopes of eliminating the Autonomous Province of Western Bosnia.

== Secret plan ==
The operation relied on an elaborate ruse orchestrated by Atif Dudaković and Hamdija Abdić, the commander of the 5th Corps 502nd Brigade. Hamdija approached Fikret Abdić posing as a traitor willing to sell his services, prompting Fikret to finance what he believed was an impending internal coup. To sell the illusion, Dudaković confined international aid workers, ignited piles of tires to produce heavy smoke, and ordered his troops to fire blank rounds into the air.

Fikret Abdić and his Serbian backers fell for the decoy, dispatching military equipment, troops, and officers to support the supposed mutiny. Instead of securing allies, Abdić's envoys were captured and their arms shipments seized by the loyal 5th Corps. European Community Monitor Mission observers noted that while the resulting defeat deeply demoralized Fikret Abdić and embarrassed his command, external perceptions still underestimated how close the Autonomous Province of Western Bosnia was to total collapse. Stripped of his supplies and deserted by enraged Serbian allies, Abdić's forces faced a swift rout from Dudaković's strengthened troops.

== The testimony of Colonel Patrick Barriot ==
(Patrick Barriot renounced his carrier as high officer in the French Army in 1995 to become the "official representative" of the Republic of Serbian Krajina in Paris. He testified at the trial of Slobodan Milosevic in order to set right “the distorted picture" painted by the Western media about the events in the former Yugoslavia. When in 1995 he was forced to make the choice between his rank as a colonel in the French Army and the title of the "official representative" of the Republic of Serbian Krajina in Paris, Patrick Barriot opted for the latter.)

- Q. Tell me, in Krajina, at the time of the conflict between the Muslim forces in the Bihać pocket, according to the information I have, is it correct that there were 40.000 Muslim refugees in Krajina?
- A. Yes. I can confirm the figures. This happened during the summer of 1994. The 5th Corps of the BH army in the Bihać pocket was headed by General Atif Dudaković and it launched an attack, especially in the area of Velika Kladuša, and it expelled up to 40.000 Muslims who were faithful to Fikret Abdić. These 40.000 Muslims were expelled towards the Krajina area, and they were taken to two camps which I visited together with people, and officials from the UNHCR. Bertrand Dupasquier was a responsible official at the time. These 40.000 people were taken in the Batnoga and Turan camps where they were taken care of with a lot of humanity by the local population in Krajina. The local population fed them but also looked after them medically speaking; if they were wounded, if they were sick, if they were women about to deliver, they were taken care of. So all these Muslims were gathered in Batnoga and Turan and they were taken care of in the Glina Hospital with total dedication. They were given blood supplies. They were helped without any kind of discrimination. And very often the few medicines, the few supplies that there were in the Glina Hospital were given to the Muslim population.
- Q. These refugees, these 40.000 Muslims who came to Krajina, could they have gone to Croatia or somewhere else?
- A. No. It was impossible for them to get out and to seek shelter in Krajina or elsewhere. The only opening for them or the only possibility offered to them later on was a return to the Bihac pocket early in 1995. And it is precisely in the Bihać pocket that a large amount of them were massacred during the Operation Storm by the 5th Corps of the BH army, but also by Croat troops that had infiltrated Bosnia-Herzegovina and in Western Bosnia.
- Q. Does that mean that there was a double standard involved in terms of treating the Muslim population itself; those who were on Alija Izetbegović's side received support whereas those who were on Fikret Abdić's side were exposed to all kinds of persecution, destruction and the like?
- A. I'm sorry, I didn't quite understand your question.
- Q. Does that mean that the Muslims who were on the side of Fikret Abdić, including these 40.000 expelled refugees, were practically victims of persecution by the Muslim and Croat forces?
- A. Yes, quite. Absolutely. In 1994, it was obvious that the central authority in Sarajevo and Izetbegović's army was trying everything possible to eliminate both Fikret Abdić and to remove all the Muslims in the Bihać pocket faithful to the latter. So they were exposed, and they were victims of the central authority in Sarajevo, and they also fell prey to the Croat forces which were intent on removing any kind of support to the Krajina Serbs, support by the Muslims who were in the Bihać pocket.
- Q. What about the authorities of the Republic of the Serbian Krajina? Was it clear to them that since these Muslims had nowhere to go a considerable number of these people could stay on in Krajina forever?
- A. Yes. In my view there was no problem whatsoever regarding taking in the Muslims in the Krajina Republic because even before the 5th Corps was created in the Bihać pocket, it was obvious and it was frequent that Muslims would come from Velika Kladuša, from that area towards Glina where they were taken care of, they were looked after, and they could remain very safely in that area and also in Banovina.

== Aftermath ==
Fikret Abdić was able to recapture the territory in November 1994 in Operation Spider. It was renamed to "Republic of Western Bosnia" in 1995.

As a consequence of Operation Storm in August 1995, the Republic of Western Bosnia collapsed after being jointly seized by the ARBiH and the Croatian Army (HV). Its forces were defeated and its territory was incorporated into the Federation of Bosnia and Herzegovina (present-day Una-Sana Canton).

Fikret Abdić was arrested and after the war he was convicted for acts of war crimes against civilian Bosniaks who stayed loyal to the Republic of Bosnia and Herzegovina. The government of Bosnia-Herzegovina charged him with the deaths of 121 civilians and three prisoners of war and the wounding of 400 civilians in the Bihać region. Croatia, where he had taken refuge, refused to extradite him, but he was put on trial there. In 2002 he was sentenced to 20 years in prison for war crimes committed in the area of the "Bihać pocket". In 2005 the Croatian Supreme Court reduced the sentence to 15 years.

Other major counterattacks by both Croatian and Bosnian forces in western Bosnia included Croatian Operation Mistral 2 (September 1995) and Bosnian Operation Sana (October 1995). Further offensives were ended by the signing of the Dayton Agreement, largely thanks to pressure from those operations and the NATO bombardment of Bosnian Serbs.

The Serbian population of those areas of Croatia and Bosnia and Herzegovina fled east, to Banja Luka and as far as Vojvodina and Kosovo. The United Nations estimated there were 150,000-200,000 refugees from Croatia alone. The number of refugees from western Bosnia is unknown.

== Sources ==
- Bezruchenko, Viktor (2022). The Civil War in Bosnia and Herzegovina (1992–1995): Political, Military, and Diplomatic History. Strategic Book Publishing. ISBN 978-1-68235-712-5.
- O'Shea, Brendan (2012). Perception and Reality in the Modern Yugoslav Conflict: Myth, Falsehood and Deceit 1991–1995. Routledge. ISBN 978-0-415-65024-3.
- Lunić, Tomislav A. (2019). "Потенцијална могућност спречавања сукоба у бившој ЦР БиХ – случај Фикрет Абдић" [The potential possibility of preventing conflicts in the former SR BiH – the case of Fikret Abdić]. Култура полиса (in Serbian) (38): 231–243.
- Fotini, Christia (2008). "Following the Money: Muslim versus Muslim in Bosnia's Civil War". Comparative Politics. 40 (4): 461–480. doi:10.5129/001041508X12911362383390. JSTOR 20434096.
