= 5th Corps (Army of the Republic of Bosnia and Herzegovina) =

- Fifth Corps insignia
- Active: 21st October 1992 – 1st December 2004 (dissolved as part of the Army of the Federation of Bosnia and Herzegovina)
- Country: Bosnia and Herzegovina
- Allegiance: Army of the Republic of Bosnia and Herzegovina
- Branch: Bosnian Ground Forces
- Type: Motorized, Mechanized, Mountain and Light Infantry
- Role: Defense and liberation of Bosnian Krajina (Bosanska Krajina)
- Size: 10,152 (21.10.1992); 17,202 (24.03.1995); 18,106 (Peak size at the end of year 1995); 15,884 (01. 01. 1996); Fallen: 3248 (1992-1995); Wounded: 5546 (1992-1995); Approximate number of soldiers 5th Corps had throughout the war fluctuated between 12 000 and 13 000.; During the Bosnian war between 50% and 60% of the fighters of the 5th Corps have been put out of action.
- Garrison/HQ: Bihać Kasarna "Adil Bešić" (Main HQ) Brigade's HQs
- Nicknames: Sila Nebeska (Heavenly Force); Ljuti Krajišnici (Angry Krajišniks)
- Mottos: "Za slobodu i nezavisnost Bosne.""For the freedom and independence of Bosnia."; "Hoćemo li preko Une? Hoćemo!""Will we cross the Una? Yes we will!"; Battle cry: "Tri tekbira.""Three takbirs."
- Colors: Green, white, black, maroon, turquoise, gold.
- March: ARBiH orchestra march 5th Corps march
- Mascot: Pegasus
- Anniversaries: ARBiH formation anniversary. Formation of the 5th Corps. Anniversaries of different brigades formations. Battles and offensives anniversaries. Remembrance days for the fallen. Anniversaries of different events.
- Equipment: When the unit was formed the Corps had the following armament: T-55A Tank (1); M53/59 Praga (1); BOV M86 (1); Improvised APC (2); TAM 110 Communications truck (1); 76 mm ZIS-3 (2); 75 mm Pak 40 (1); Mortars 60mm, 82mm, and 120mm (20); Improvised rifle grenade launchers (unknown); Improvised mortars 40mm, 120mm (unknown); Automatic rifles (1,094); Semi-Automatic rifles (479); Light Machine-Guns (152); Sniper rifles (48); Osa Anti-Tank Launchers (10); Zolja Anti-Tank Launchers (28); M57RB Anti-tank Launchers (20); Anti-Aircraft Guns 12.7 mm (3); Recoilless rifle BST M60 60 mm (2); Numerous variants of hunting rifles and handguns
- Engagements: Bosnian War: Intra-Bosnian Muslim War; Siege of Bihać (1992-1995); Battle of Velika Kladuša (1993); Operation Munja '93; Operation Tiger (1994); Operation Breza '94; Operation Grmeč '94; Operation Shield '94; Operation Spider; Mala Kladuša offensive; Operation Vrnograč '95; Operation Sword–1; Operation Storm; Operation Sana; Operation Prijedor '95
- Decorations: Brigade decorations: 501st Mountain Brigade awarded with title Famous (Slavna); 502nd Mountain Brigade first awarded with title Famous (Slavna), later with title Knightly (Viteška); 503rd Mountain Brigade awarded with title Famous (Slavna); 505th Motorized Brigade first awarded with title Famous (Slavna), later with title Knightly (Viteška); 511th Mountain Brigade awarded with title Famous (Slavna); Awarded medals: Order of Heroes of the Liberation War - Major Adil Bešić and Brigadier Izet Nanić; Order of the Golden Crest with Swords - Salih Dizdarić, Sidik Smlatić and Lieutenant general Atif Dudaković; Order of the Golden Lily with a Golden Wreath - Farko Hodžić; Order of the Golden Lily with a Silver Wreath - Muhamed Delalić; Order of Military Merit with Golden Swords - Salih Omerčević; Order of Military Merit with Silver Swords - Mirsad Sedić; Medal for bravery - Zijad Kudić and Mirsad Litrić; Military merit medal - Jasmin Čajić; Golden Lily - 144 recipients; Golden shield - not defined; Silver shield - not defined; Bihać resistance medal - 25 recipients; Plaque of the Defender of the Bihać - unknown number; 5th Corps is the most recognised unit of ARBiH. Holding the status legendary between the people. Despite its small size it managed to defend Bihać pocket and after that lead a successful number of operations liberating the most captured territory of the Bosnia and Herzegovina. At the end of the war it held more than 11% of the RBiH territory.

Commanders
- Notable commanders: Atif Dudaković - Vihor; Izet Nanić - Igman †; Jasmin Kulenović - Havarija †; Adil Bešić †; Ramiz Dreković; Hajrudin Osmanagić; Mirsad Crnkić †; Mirsad Sedić; Emir Kliko; Salih Omerčević †; Asim Bajrektarević †; Hazim Toromanović - Taran †; Jusuf Lipovača - Juta; Amir Avdić - Kobra; Isak Fazlić - Isko; Jasmin Keranović - Jasko †; Jasmir Ramulić - Api †; Muhamed Delalić - Hamdo; Esad Begić; Kasim Ljubijankić - Čaruga †; Senad Šarganović - Šargan; Mirsad Selmanović; Hamdija Abdić - Tigar; Asim Hadžipašić - Asko; Salih Dizdarić †; Sidik Smlatić †; Sead Duraković - Grom; Nijaz Miljković; Hilmija Sadiković - Cigo †; Hase Kovačević; Ibrahim Nadarević; Fatmir Muratović; Muharem Šahinović - Hari †; Nijaz Veladžić - Veljun; Vejsil Korać †; Halil Ćejvan; Hasib Dulić; Muhamed Babić; Hamdija Mustafić; Farko Hodžić - Hodža; Sead Toromanović - Taran; Refik Kauković - Refko; Hajro Huskić - Kruško †; Fuad Sadiković; Hasan Musić - Musa †; Ahmet Mržljak - Brena †; Šerif Veladžić †; Esnaf Rekić †; Nijaz Begić - Keso †; Šerif Veladžić - Safin †

Insignia
- 5th Corps patch: Pegasus
- Identification symbol: ARBiH patch 5th Corps Pegasus patch and later newly designed 5th Corps insignia patch similar to the other ARBiH Corps patches in design. 5th Corps flag and flags of its brigades and larger units. Brigade patches and patches from other 5th Corps units. Other types of identification (armbands, headbands, brooches, etc.).

The 5th Corps was one of seven corps and smallest one of the Army of the Republic of Bosnia and Herzegovina. The formation was around the Bihać pocket to protect it against the surrounding Serb forces which included the entire Army of the Kninska Krajina (VRSK), 1st and 2nd Corps of the Army of Srpska Republic (VRS), including the reinforcements from other VRS Corps, Yugoslav Military, Serbia Military and paramilitary formations. The assigned zone of responsibility of the 5th Corps encompassed almost the entire Bosnian Krajina, but in reality it only covered approximately 1,150 km^{2} of the free Bosnian Krajina territory. The length of the front of the Bihać pocket was about 180 km, and within the defended territory lived over 200,000 inhabitants. The Bihać pocket found itself in a very unfavorable situation, due to the constant lack of weapons, ammunition, food, and medicine. The shortest distance from Bihać pocket to the rest of the free territory in Bosnia and Herzegovina was about 100 km, while Velika Kladuša was only about thirty kilometers away from the territory held by the Croatian Army, before the secession (after the secession the free territory towards free Croatia and rest of the world increased about additional ~30 km). The 5th Corps also fought secessional Bosniak forces National Defence of the Autonomous Province of Western Bosnia (NOZB, which had approximate size of a division reinforced by Serbs with equipment, supplies, training and reinforcements) stationed in Velika Kladuša county and parts of Cazin county, loyal to Fikret Abdić, who was cooperating with Serb forces.

During the war it is estimated that 5th Corps at all time had tied to themselves 70,000 serbian troops, when secession happened additional 10,000 secessional Bosniak troops were tied to the lines of 5th Corps. Just days before the last 5th Corps military operation, Operation Sana, 5th Corps defeated Abdić's army and supporters, bringing the rogue autonomous province under government's control in the Downfall of Second autonomy operation. After that 5th Corps started all-out offensive Operation Sana, connecting to the rest of the Bosnian territory while bringing a number of previously lost and occupied regions of Bosnia and Herzegovina under government control, defeating 1st and 2nd Krajiški corps, strengthened with units that escaped Kninska Krajina and multiple Serb paramilitary forces coming to aid from different frontlines. During Sana 95 and Downfall of Second autonomy 5th Corps also liberated towns and communes in border section of Croatia. Connecting with Croat forces in Grabovac-Rakovica area, Korenica-Frkašić area, Bogovolja-Cetingrad area and on an overlooking hill west of Plitvička jezera. The solemnly meet up was done on the border bridge in Tražačka Raštela, where commanders of both countries shook hands.

== History ==
The ministry of military affairs passed the order for the formation of the Fifth Corps of the ARBiH on September 29, 1992, and the final approval by the presidency of Bosnia and Herzegovina (order no. 02-111-738/92) on October 21, 1992. In the formation of the 5th Corps there have been the de-formation of the Unsko-sanski Operative Group and the Territorial Defense Groups of Bihać pocket.

After the Dayton Peace Agreement was signed, the 5th Corps had a wide reorganisation. This reorganisation was still largely influenced by the original war layout. Command was reorganised and adapted to new units structure. New brigades were formed and some units of 7th Corps which were made of residents from Bosanska Krajina region merged with 5th Corps units. New layout stayed until the ARBiH's disbandment on 14 December 1997.

After that 5th Corps got complete new reorganisation under VFBiH, where original organisation was completely disbanded losing all previous layouts in process. 5th Corps got reorganised with system used in US Armed forces units and command. Thus becoming whole new unit only keeping some of the units name's honorarily. It stayed like that til final dissolution in the newly formed OSBiH on 1 December 2004 when it officially ceased to exist.

Currently. the 5th Corps lives through different manifestations, anniversaries held through every year, books that have been written and remembrance days. Several Museums and Remembrance organisations on different levels have been formed.

== 5th Corps command ==
At the meeting of the Bihać region, held on April 13, 1992, the appointment of Major Hajrudin Osmanagić as the commander of the Territorial Defense of the Bihać region was confirmed. Major Hajrudin Osmanagić was given control, but he stepped down before he took the post in favour of Dreković and Captain First class Ramiz Dreković took control as commander of the Fifth Corps, thus becoming first commander of the Fifth Corps. After him, Brigadier General Atif Dudaković became commander of the Fifth Corps.

- Corps Staff: 28 officers, 2 under-officers, 42 soldiers
- 1st Commander: Captain I Class Ramiz Dreković - from forming to 1 November 1993
- 2nd Commander: Brigadier General Atif Dudaković - from 1 November 1993 until disbandment in 2006.
- Deputy Commander Chief of Staff:
  - Major Ramiz Duraković
  - Major Mirsad Sedić
- Assistants for moral IPD and MP - Ejub Topić
- Assistants for security - Sakib Butković
- Logistic - Bećir Sirovina

== 5th Corps units (in 1995) ==
=== 5th Corps units ===
- 501st Famous Mountain Brigade
  - Commander: Brigadier Senad Šarganović
- 502nd Knightly Mountain Brigade
  - Commander: Colonel Hamdija Abdić
- 503rd Famous Mountain Brigade
  - Commander: Brigadier Hamdo Delalić
- 504th Light Infantry Brigade (Disbanded on 15. April 1994)
  - Commander: Kovačević Hase
- 505th Knightly Motorized Brigade
  - Commander: Brigadier Izet Nanić
- 506th Liberation Brigade
  - Commander: Major Nijaz Miljković
- 510th Bosnian Liberation Brigade
  - Commander: Brigadier Amir Avdić
- 511th Famous Mountain Brigade
  - Commander: Major Mirsad Sedić
- 517th Light Brigade
  - Commander: Major Ibrahim Nadarević
- Command of the 5th Corps
  - Chief of staff: Brigadier Mirsad Selmanović
- 5th Battalion of Military Police
  - Commander: Senijad Mešić
- 5th Mountain Battalion (disbanded in December 1994)
- Special Forces Detachment (7th April 1992 till 15th March 1994, nicknamed "Šarganovi")
  - Commander: Esnaf Rekić
- 5th Reconnaissance-Sabotage Company (nicknamed "Havarija")
  - Commander: Jasmin Kulenović- Havarija
- 5th Tank-Armoured Company
- 5th Mixed Artillery Division
  - Commander: Rizvo Behrem
- 5th Mixed Artillery Regiment
- Mixed Anti-Armored Artillery Division
- 5th Artillery-Missile Anti-Aircraft Defense Unit
- Aviation Group Bihać (Branch of ARBiH Air Force)
- 5th Atomic-Biological-Chemical-Defense Company
- 5th Engineering Battalion
- 5th Logistics Base
  - Commander: Bećir Sirovina
- 5th Corps Training and Recruitment Center
- 5th Corps Dedicated-Military industry
- Art Company of the 5th Corps
- Medical rehabilitation center "Arif Hasanagić" Gata

== Brigades on the day of formation ==
The first brigade formed in this territory was the 101st Independent Muslim Krajina Brigade, established on April 9, 1992, in the village of Kovačevići, municipality of Cazin. It was also the first brigade ever formed on the territory of the Republic of Bosnia and Herzegovina. In addition, in other settlements of the Bihać pocket, units of a higher tactical-operational level were established.

Thus, in Bihać, on July 19, members of the newly organized First and Second Bihać Infantry Brigades were assembled from already existing Territorial Defense detachments. In August, in Cazin, the 1st Cazin Infantry Brigade was founded in the same way, and in Bužim, on August 15, the 105th Bužim Krajina Infantry Brigade was formed.

On September 1, 1992, the 111th Bosanska Krupa Infantry Brigade was established as the largest unit, numbering 1,692 members.

Due to the absence of an operational-tactical command, there was a need to form such a command that would unite the existing brigades and establish a chain of leadership and command over these units, both in planning and preparation as well as in conducting combat operations of larger scale. Based on these needs, and by order of the Supreme Command of the Army of the Republic of Bosnia and Herzegovina, dated July 29, 1992, the Una Operational Group was formed on August 13. This group soon changed its name to the Una-Sana Operational Group (USOG). This OG took command over all units until the formation of the 5th Corps, which was ordered by the decision of the Presidency of the Republic of Bosnia and Herzegovina.

Ramiz Dreković was appointed commander of the USOG, while Ramiz Duraković was named his deputy and chief of staff. On September 29, 1992, the Supreme Command Headquarters of the Army of the Republic of Bosnia and Herzegovina issued order no. 02-111-738/92 for the formation of the 5th Corps of the Army of the Republic of Bosnia and Herzegovina, with Bihać designated as its headquarters. Due to the situation prevailing in the Bihać pocket at the time, this order was not carried out until October 21, 1992, which is considered the official date of the founding of the 5th Corps.

All soldiers and officers of the disbanded Una-Sana Operational Group were incorporated into the newly formed 5th Corps. This group had included the infantry brigades of the Bihać pocket Territorial Defense, which demonstrated loyalty to the Republic Government. At that time, the Corps consisted of seven brigades—all of them infantry units—along with six lower-level units (battalion or company), of various purposes, as well as a logistics base and the Corps command, with a total strength of 10,152 members.

List of brigades:

- 1st Bihać Infantry Brigade
- 2nd Bihać Muslim-Croat Infantry Brigade
- 1st Cazin Infantry Brigade
- 105th Bužim Infantry Brigade
- 101st Muslim Krajina Brigade
- 111th Bosanska Krupa Infantry Brigade
- 1st Velika Kladuša Infantry Brigade

== Liberated territory ==
In the Republic of Bosnia and Herzegovina:

- Rest of the Cazin county (Twice, including the liberation after downfall of First autonomy.).
- Rest of Bihać county to the mountains Oštrelj and Osječenica.
- Entirety of Bosanska Krupa county.
- Entirety of Velika Kladuša county (Twice, including the liberation after downfall of First autonomy.).
- Entirety of Bosanski Petrovac county to southeast towards the mountain Srnetica and towards Donji Ribnik. Stopping at the village Vrbljani.
- Ključ towards Mrkonjić Grad stopping on the mountain of Čađavica. Meeting up in Mrkonjić Grad with Croat forces. Liberated the valley south of Velečevo up to the commune of Vrbljani and Medna towards Podbrdo. To the west connecting to hill Osječenica via the mountain Srnetica and communes Drinić, Uvala, Busije, ... (Entirety of prewar Ključ county)
- Entirety of Sanski Most county.
- Mountain Grmeč
- Parts of Novi Grad county: Rudice, Crna Rijeka, Kršlje, Ćele, Tisova etc. towards Ljubija in Prijedor.
- Parts of Prijedor county: Ljubija, Zecovi, Rasavci, Oštra Luka, Ništavci, Ališići, Gaćani, Tomašica, Rakelići stopping at the suburbs of Prijedor in between Miljakovci and Gomjenica.
- Parts of Banja Luka county in cooperation with 7th Corps, 17th Knightly Krajina Mountain brigade stopping in the area between Dobrnja and Kmećani. Liberating communes like Stričići, Vilusi Ðurđevići, Bronzani Majdan, ... and mountain Manjača.

In the Republic of Croatia:

West of Bihać (Mainly to attack VRSK from behind before they could relocate and fortify themselves.):

- Plješevica
- Željava Air Base
- Frkašić
- Bjelopolje
- Grabušić
- Korenica
- Vrelo Koreničko
- Rudanovac
- Prijeboj
- Ličko Petrovo Selo
- Drežnik Grad
- Plitvička Jezera
- Grabovac
- Rakovica

North and northwest of Velika Kladuša (Mainly to not let VRSK relocate and fortify itself and because of NOZB APZB depots near the border, after Croatian green light.):

- Bogovolja
- Šiljkovača
- Maljevac
- Gejkovac
- Cetingrad
- Buhača
- Polojski Varoš

East of Bužim:

- Bojna
- And some of the hill tops giving better positions until HV forces arrived.

In the cooperation with HV:

- Slunj
- Slunjska brda
- Rest of the villages and communes on the border with RBiH east of Slunj.

During Operation Sana, the 5th Corps captured the largest ARBiH loot of the war. Inventory of ARBiH weaponry grew exponentially after Operation Sana, allowing units to be equipped further for Operation Prijedor.

Besides liberating territory and capturing a large number of different equipment from the enemy and putting it in own use, the biggest war trophies of the Bosnian war were tanks. During the course of the war, the Fifth Corps managed to capture a large number of tanks (Approximately up to 70 counting the older models like T34, M18 and M36, while capturing between 40 and 50 T55A tanks), but the trophies are the first nine tanks that were immediately put to use in fighting by the 5th Tank Company after capturing. The rest of the tanks were pulled out to inventory because of lack of crew and were only after the end of the war integrated in the unit.

Eight war trophies of 5th Corps:

- The first M84 tank nicknamed "Pegaz" (Pegasus) captured in August 1995, near Cazin in the village of Krivaja, during the enemy offensive "Spaljena Zemlja".
- The second M84 tank nicknamed "Grom" (Thunder) in September 1995, near Bosanski Petrovac, during Operation Sana 95.
- The third M84 tank captured in commune Sanica, near Ključ during the advance to Sanski most in Operation Sana 95.

They also captured six T-55A tanks:

- The first T55A nicknamed "Žabac"(Frog) in June 1992, in the village of Čekrlije near Bihać.
- The second T55A nicknamed "Vitez" (Knight) September 1994, near Bužim, during the enemy offensive Breza 94.
- The third T55A nicknamed "Labud" (Swan) and fourth T55A unnamed (distinctive by yellow fume extractor) in October 1994, at Grabež near Bihać, during Operation Grmeč 94.
- The fifth T55A nicknamed "Crna Udovica" (Black Widow) in November 1994, near the village of Klokot close to Bihać.
- The sixth T55A nicknamed "Kobra" (Cobra) in the outskirts of Sanski Most, during Operation Sana 95.
