= 1st Krajina Corps =

1st Krajina Corps: 1. крајишки корпус
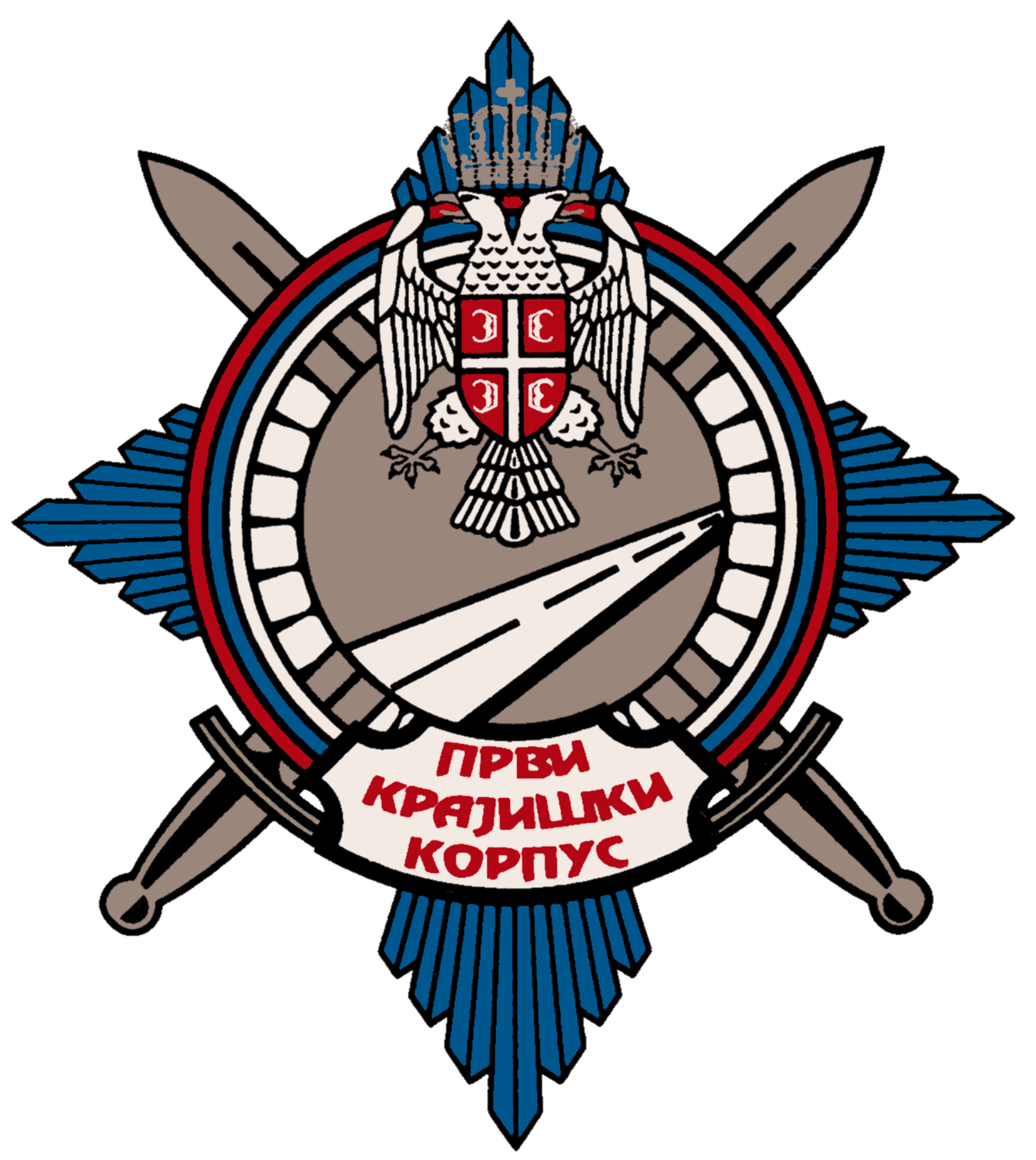
- Emblem of the 1st Krajina Corps
- Active: June 1, 1992 — 1996
- Country: (Republika Srpska (1992–1995)) Republika Srpska
- Branch: Army
- Type: Army Corps
- Role: The protection of the western parts of Republika Srpska
- Size: 60,000; 72,000 by formation
- Part of: Army of Republika Srpska
- Garrison/HQ: Banja Luka
- Anniversaries: 1 June
- Engagements: Bosnian War; Battle of Kupres (1992); Operation Corridor 92; Operation Vrbas '92; Operation Sadejstvo; Operation Brana '94; Operation Breza '94; Operation Shield '94; Operation Spider; Operation Una; Operation Prijedor '95; Other operations
- Decorations: Order of Nemanjići

Commanders
- Commander: Colonel General Momir Talić

1st Krajina Corps (Serbian: 1. крајишки корпус, 1. krajiški korpus) was one of the six corps of the Army of Republika Srpska (VRS). It was the largest, most experienced, and the most capable corps in the army during the conflict. Before implementation into the Army of Republika Srpska, the corps was known as 5th Corps of Yugoslav People's Army or Banja Luka Corps. Because of this fact it was successor of the infrastructure, organization and most of the equipment. The main task of the corps was to defend western parts of the Republika Srpska, today these areas are mostly part of Banja Luka region. It was the most numbered corps of VRS with between 60,000 and 72,000 soldiers. The Corps saw heavy involvement throughout the Bosnian War; according to postwar records, the unit sustained significant attrition, with thousands of casualties reported during the conflict's duration.

== Organization ==
The headquarters of the 1st Krajina Corps was in Banja Luka. After the establishment of the corps, corps remained in previous 5th Corps organization which was actual during 1992. Responsibility zone of the 1st Krajina Corps was determined by rivers Sava, Una, Ukrina, Ugar and mountains Majdanska and Vlašić.

== 1st Krajina Corps Units ==
=== War-time organization ===
- Corps Command
- 1st Armoured Brigade (1. okbr.)
- 2nd Armoured Brigade (2. okbr.)
- 16th Krajina Motorized Brigade (16. kmtbr.)
- 27th Derventa Motorized Brigade (27. mtbr.)
- 31st Mountain Storm Brigade (31. bjbr.) (HQ in Manjača barracks)
- 43rd Prijedor Motorized Brigade (43. mtbr.)
- 30th Light Infantry Division (30. lpd.) (disestablished during 1992)

==== Light infantry brigades ====
- 1st Banja Luka Light Infantry Brigade
- 2nd Banja Luka Light Infantry Brigade
- 3rd Banja Luka Light Infantry Brigade
- 4th Banja Luka Light Infantry Brigade
- 1st Čelinac Light Infantry Brigade
- 1st Doboj Light Infantry Brigade
- 11th Dubica Light Infantry Brigade
- 1st Gradiška Light Infantry Brigade
- 1st Kneževo Light Infantry Brigade
- 1st Kotor Varoš Light Infantry Brigade
- 5th Kozara Light Infantry Brigade
- 2nd Krajina Light Infantry Brigade
- 1st Krnjin Light Infantry Brigade
- 1st Laktaši Light Infantry Brigade (later involved into 2nd Krajina Brigade)
- 11th Mrkonjić Grad Light Infantry Brigade
- 1st Novi Grad Light Infantry Brigade (November 1994 – end of 1995 as part of 2nd Krajina Corps)
- 1st Osinja Light Infantry Brigade (from March 1, 1994, part of 27th Derventa Motorized Brigade)
- 1st Ozren Light Infantry Brigade
- 2nd Ozren Light Infantry Brigade
- 3rd Ozren Light Infantry Brigade
- 4th Ozren Light Infantry Brigade
- 1st Podgrmeč Light Infantry Brigade (never formed)
- 1st Prnjavor Light Infantry Brigade
- 6th Sana Brigade
- 1st Srbac Light Infantry Brigade
- 19th Srbobran Light Infantry Brigade
- 1st Šipovo Light Infantry Brigade
- 1st Teslić Light Infantry Brigade
- 2nd Teslić Light Infantry Brigade (moved into 1st Teslić Light Inf. Brigade)
- 1st Trebava Light Infantry Brigade
- 1st Trebiš Light Infantry Brigade
- 1st Vučjak Light Infantry Brigade
- 22nd Light Infantry Brigade

==== Artillery units ====
- 1st Mixed Artillery Regiment (1. map.)
- 9th Mixed Artillery Regiment (9. map.)
- 1st Mixed Anti-Tank Artillery Regiment (1. mpoap.)
- 1st Light Artillery Regiment of Air Defense (1. lappvo.)

==== Other and background units ====
- 1st Engineering Regiment
- 9th Engineering Regiment
- 1st Pontoon Battalion
- 1st Signal Battalion
- 9th Signal Battalion
- 1st Military Police Battalion
- 9th Military Police Battalion
- 1st Automobile Battalion
- 1st Medicine Battalion
- Independent Muslim Unit "Meša Selimović" (became part of 27th Derventa Motorized Brigade)
- Polygon and Arrest Unit "Manjača"
- 36th Independent Armour Battalion (part of 30th Light Infantry Division)
- 30th Signal Battalion
- Storm Battalion "Wolves of Vučjak" (previously was part of 27th Derventa Motorized Brigade)
- Students Brigade

==== Tactical and Operative Groups ====
- Tactical Group 1 (TG-1)
- Tactical Group 2 (TG-2)
- Tactical Group 3 (TG-3)
- Tactical Group 4 (TG-4)
- Tactical Group 5 (TG-5)
- Operative Group Vlašić (OG Vlašić)
- Operative Group Doboj or 9th Operative Group (OG-9, OG Doboj)
- Operative Group Prijedor
- Light Infantry Brigades Group Banja Luka
