= Operation Sana =

Military offensive during the Bosnian War in 1995

Coordinates: 44.769457°N 16.651866°E

- Part of the Bosnian War
- Objectives of Operation Sana on the map of Bosnia and Herzegovina
Date	13 September – 13 October 1995
Location	Western Bosnia and Herzegovina
Result	ARBiH victory: VRS forces forced to withdraw toward Prijedor and Novi Grad; Frontlines stabilize outside Prijedor at the onset of the October 12 ceasefire
Territorial changes	ARBiH captures Bosanska Krupa, Bosanski Petrovac, Ključ and Sanski Most

Belligerents
Bosnia and Herzegovina	Republika Srpska

Commanders and leaders
(Bosnia and Herzegovina) Atif Dudaković (Bosnia and Herzegovina) Mehmed Alagić	(Republika Srpska (1992–1995)) Ratko Mladić (Republika Srpska (1992–1995)) Radivoje Tomanić (Republika Srpska (1992–1995)) Željko Ražnatović

Units involved
Army of the Republic of Bosnia and Herzegovina; 5th Corps; 7th Corps	Army of Republika Srpska; 1st Krajina Corps; 2nd Krajina Corps; Serb Volunteer Guard; Special Operations Unit

Strength
(Bosnia and Herzegovina) 15,000 (initially) (Bosnia and Herzegovina) ~25,000 (peak)	(Republika Srpska (1992–1995)) 8,000 (initially) (Republika Srpska (1992–1995)) 24,000 (peak)

Casualties and losses
(Bosnia and Herzegovina) 178 killed (Bosnia and Herzegovina) 588 wounded (Bosnia and Herzegovina) 41 captured	(Republika Srpska (1992–1995)) 900 killed (Republika Srpska (1992–1995)) ~1,000 wounded
- (Republika Srpska (1992–1995)) 30,000-50,000 of Serb civilians displaced (Republika Srpska (1992–1995)) 100-120 Serb civilians killed

Operation Sana (Bosnian: Operacija Sana) was the final military offensive of the Army of the Republic of Bosnia and Herzegovina (Armija Republike Bosne i Hercegovine – ARBiH) in western Bosnia and Herzegovina and the last major battle of the Bosnian War. It was launched from the area of Bihać on 13 September 1995, against the Army of Republika Srpska (Vojska Republike Srpske – VRS), and involved advances towards Bosanski Petrovac, Sanski Most and Bosanska Krupa. At the same time, the Croatian Army (Hrvatska vojska – HV) and the Croatian Defence Council (Hrvatsko vijeće obrane – HVO) were engaging the VRS in Operation Mistral 2 further to the southeast. After an initial 70-kilometre (43 mi) advance, VRS reinforcements managed to stop the ARBiH short of Sanski Most and Bosanski Novi, and reversed some of the ARBiH's territorial gains in a counterattack. After a part of the ARBiH 5th Corps was threatened with defeat around the town of Ključ, the ARBiH requested assistance from the HV.

The HV and HVO launched Operation Southern Move in response, removing the VRS pressure from Ključ and allowing the 5th Corps, reinforced by the 7th Corps, to resume its advance and capture Sanski Most on 12 October, by which time a comprehensive ceasefire was to come into effect throughout the country. Combat continued for another eight days without significant changes to the frontlines. Fighting did not resume, and the war ended the following month following negotiation and acceptance of the Dayton Agreement.

The operation commenced during a NATO bombing campaign against the VRS, codenamed Operation Deliberate Force, which targeted Bosnian Serb air defences, artillery and storage facilities initially in the area of Sarajevo, but also elsewhere in the country. Operation Sana, alongside concurrent HV and HVO offensives, sparked debate among military analysts as to whether the ground assaults or NATO's airstrikes were more responsible for ending the Bosnian War. Also in question was to what extent the advances of the ARBiH, HVO and HV were assisted by the airstrikes, and conversely, to what extent they hampered the VRS.

== Background ==
As the Yugoslav People's Army (Jugoslovenska narodna armija – JNA) withdrew from Croatia following the acceptance and start of implementation of the Vance plan, its 55,000 officers and soldiers born in Bosnia and Herzegovina were transferred to a new Bosnian Serb army, which was later renamed the Army of Republika Srpska (Vojska Republike Srpske – VRS). This re-organisation followed the declaration of the Serbian Republic of Bosnia and Herzegovina on 9 January 1992, ahead of the referendum on the independence of Bosnia and Herzegovina that took place between 29 February and 1 March 1992. This declaration would later be cited by the Bosnian Serbs as a pretext for the Bosnian War. Bosnian Serbs began fortifying the capital, Sarajevo, and other areas on 1 March 1992. On the following day, the first fatalities of the war were recorded in Sarajevo and Doboj. In the final days of March, Bosnian Serb forces bombarded Bosanski Brod with artillery, resulting in a cross-border operation by the Croatian Army (Hrvatska vojska – HV) 108th Brigade. On 4 April 1992, JNA artillery began shelling Sarajevo. There were other examples of the JNA directly supporting the VRS, such as during the capture of Zvornik in early April 1992, when the JNA provided artillery support from Serbia, firing across the Drina River. At the same time, the JNA attempted to defuse the situation and arrange negotiations elsewhere in the country.

The JNA and the VRS in Bosnia and Herzegovina faced the Army of the Republic of Bosnia and Herzegovina (Armija Republike Bosne i Hercegovine – ARBiH) and the Croatian Defence Council (Hrvatsko vijeće obrane – HVO), reporting to the Bosniak-dominated central government and the Bosnian Croat leadership respectively, as well as the HV, which occasionally supported HVO operations. In late April, the VRS was able to deploy 200,000 troops, hundreds of tanks, armoured personnel carriers (APCs) and artillery pieces. The HVO and the Croatian Defence Forces (Hrvatske obrambene snage – HOS) could field approximately 25,000 soldiers and a handful of heavy weapons, while the ARBiH was largely unprepared with nearly 100,000 troops, small arms for less than a half of their number and virtually no heavy weapons. Arming of the various forces was hampered by a United Nations (UN) arms embargo introduced in September 1991. By mid-May 1992, when those JNA units which had not been transferred to the VRS withdrew from Bosnia and Herzegovina to the newly declared Federal Republic of Yugoslavia, the VRS controlled approximately 60 percent of Bosnia and Herzegovina. The extent of the control was extended to about 70 percent of the country by the end of the year.

== Prelude ==
By 1995, the ARBiH and the HVO had developed into better-organised forces employing comparably large numbers of artillery pieces and good defensive fortifications. The VRS was not capable of penetrating their defences even where its forces employed sound military tactics, for instance in the Battle of Orašje in May and June 1995. In August 1995, after the fall of most of the Croatian Serb-controlled areas of Croatia during Operation Storm, the HV shifted its focus to western Bosnia. The shift was motivated by the desire to create a security zone along the Croatian border, establish Croatia as a regional power and gain favours with the West by forcing an end to the Bosnian War. The government of Bosnia and Herzegovina welcomed the move as it contributed to their goal of securing western Bosnia, as well as the largest Bosnian Serb-held city, Banja Luka.

In the final days of August 1995, NATO launched an air campaign targeting the VRS, codenamed Operation Deliberate Force. It was launched in response to the second Markale massacre of 28 August, which came on the heels of the Srebrenica massacre. Airstrikes began on 30 August, initially targeting VRS air defences, and striking targets near Sarajevo. The campaign was briefly suspended on 1 September and its scope was expanded to target artillery and storage facilities around the city. The bombing resumed on 5 September, and its scope extended to VRS air defences near Banja Luka by 9 September as NATO had nearly exhausted its list of targets near Sarajevo. On 13 September, the Bosnian Serbs accepted NATO's demand for the establishment of an exclusion zone around Sarajevo and the campaign ceased.

As the NATO bombing generally targeted VRS around Sarajevo, western Bosnia remained relatively calm following Operation Storm, except for probing attacks launched by the VRS, HVO or ARBiH near Bihać, Drvar and Glamoč. At the time the HV, HVO and ARBiH were planning a joint offensive in the region. The HV and HVO component of the offensive, codenamed Operation Mistral 2, was launched on 8 September with the aim of capturing the towns of Jajce, Šipovo and Drvar, while the ARBiH 7th Corps advanced on the right flank of the HV and the HVO towards Donji Vakuf. All four towns had been seized by 14 September, and the 7th Corps began transferring a substantial portion of its troops to the ARBiH 5th Corps in the Bihać area.

== Order of battle ==
The 15,000-strong ARBiH 5th Corps, commanded by Divisional General Atif Dudaković, was assigned the primary objectives, the capture of Bosanska Krupa, Bosanski Petrovac, Ključ and Sanski Most. Dudaković divided his eight brigades into two operational groups (OGs). OG (South), which comprised the 501st Mountain, 502nd Mountain, 510th Liberation and 517th Light Brigades, augmented by elements of the 5th Military Police Battalion, was commanded by Dudaković himself. OG (North), consisting of the 503rd Mountain, 505th Mountain, 506th Liberation and 511th Mountain Brigades, was commanded by his chief of staff, Brigadier Mirsad Selmanović. At the commencement of the operation, HV artillery provided fire support to OG South.

The 2nd Krajina Corps, commanded by Major General Radivoje Tomanić, and the 30th Infantry Division of the 1st Krajina Corps, commanded by Major General Momir Zec, were the VRS formations in the area. Tomanić, who set up his headquarters in Drvar, was in overall command in western Bosnia. Tomanić and Zec commanded a combined force of approximately 22,000 troops. The need to defend against both ARBiH corps and the combined HV and HVO force meant that the VRS had only 8,000 troops facing the 5th Corps. They were organised in six infantry or light infantry brigades stationed on the Grabež Plateau and near Bosanska Krupa and Otoka.

Initial ARBiH order of battle
Group	Unit	Notes
South	501st Mountain Brigade	Under command of Lieutenant General Atif Dudaković; Only some elements of the 5th Military Police Battalion were deployed; The assault against the VRS at the Grabež Plateau was supported by the Croatian Army artillery
South	502nd Knightly Mountain Brigade	Under command of Lieutenant General Atif Dudaković; Only some elements of the 5th Military Police Battalion were deployed; The assault against the VRS at the Grabež Plateau was supported by the Croatian Army artillery
South	510th Liberation Brigade	Under command of Lieutenant General Atif Dudaković; Only some elements of the 5th Military Police Battalion were deployed; The assault against the VRS at the Grabež Plateau was supported by the Croatian Army artillery
South	517th Light Brigade	Under command of Lieutenant General Atif Dudaković; Only some elements of the 5th Military Police Battalion were deployed; The assault against the VRS at the Grabež Plateau was supported by the Croatian Army artillery
South	5th Military Police Battalion	Under command of Lieutenant General Atif Dudaković; Only some elements of the 5th Military Police Battalion were deployed; The assault against the VRS at the Grabež Plateau was supported by the Croatian Army artillery
North	503rd Mountain Brigade	Under command of Brigadier Mirsad Selmanović
North	505th Knightly Motorised Brigade	Under command of Brigadier Mirsad Selmanović
North	506th Liberation Brigade	Under command of Brigadier Mirsad Selmanović
North	511th Mountain Brigade	Under command of Brigadier Mirsad Selmanović

Initial VRS order of battle
Area	Unit	Notes
Grabež Plateau	15th Bihać Infantry Brigade	
Grabež Plateau	17th Ključ Infantry Brigade	reinforced with a battalion of the 6th Sanska Infantry Brigade
Grabež Plateau	3rd Petrovac Infantry Brigade	
Grabež Plateau	1st Serbian Infantry Brigade	likely deployed, but unconfirmed
Bosanska Krupa and Otoka	11th Krupa Light Infantry Brigade	
Bosanska Krupa and Otoka	1st Novi Grad Infantry Brigade	

== Timeline ==
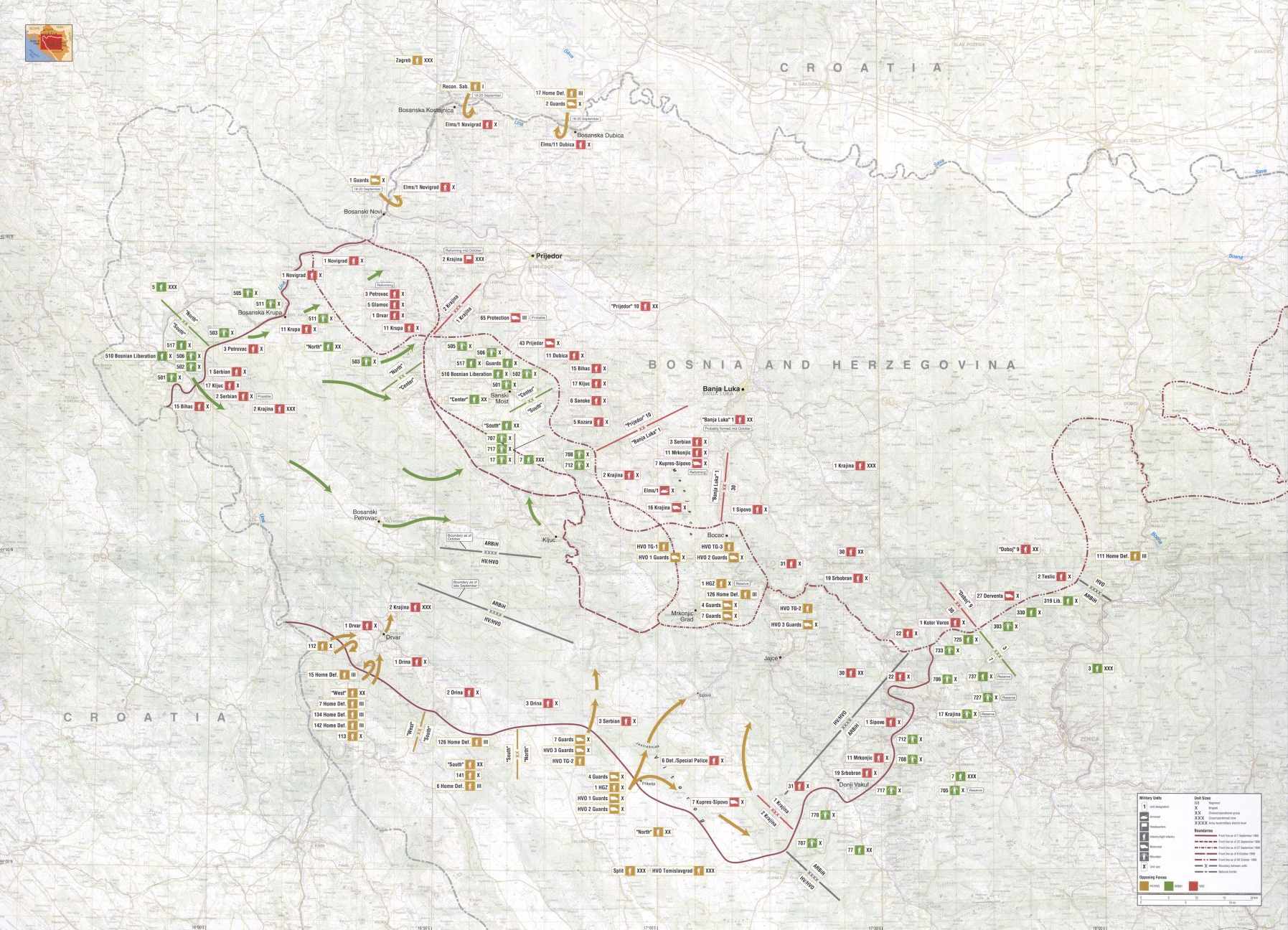
Map of battles in western Bosnia in September–October 1995; Operation Sana 95 is depicted in green on the left hand side of the map

=== First stage ===
On 13 September, the ARBiH launched its advance, codenamed Sana 95, from Bihać towards the Sana River. The initial advance was undertaken by OG South and spearheaded by the 502nd Mountain Brigade against VRS positions on the Grabež Plateau south of the town. As its defences yielded to the ground assault supported by HV artillery fire, the VRS started to retreat south towards Bosanski Petrovac, alongside civilians fleeing the area. The ARBiH pursued the retreating VRS, capturing Kulen Vakuf the next day, and Bosanski Petrovac on 15 September. That same day, the ARBiH linked up with the HV approximately 12 kilometres (7.5 miles) southeast of Bosanski Petrovac. The HV had captured Drvar and reached the Oštrelj Pass, as part of Operation Mistral 2. Both forces mistook the other for the VRS, leading to a friendly fire incident.

Even though the left flank of the salient created by the ARBiH advance was vulnerable, the VRS could not exploit the opportunity because it had no reserves available in the area. An effort to widen the salient commenced on 15 September, when OG North moved against Bosanska Krupa and Otoka in an assault spearheaded by the 503rd, 505th and 517th brigades. At the same time, OG South regrouped in Bosanski Petrovac in anticipation of reinforcements arriving from the 7th Corps. The regrouping involved the creation of a new formation, OG Centre, consisting of the 502nd, 505th, 506th and 517th brigades, all of which had been previously assigned to the two existing OGs. OG South's 501st and 510th brigades continued their advance, and captured Ključ on 17 September, having advanced covering 70 kilometres (43 miles) since the start of the operation. On the same day, OG North captured Bosanska Krupa and Otoka, and the 510th Brigade was also transferred to OG Centre. This marked the completion of the first stage of Operation Sana.

OG Centre began its advance towards Sanski Most against the 1st Drvar and 1st, 2nd and 3rd Drina infantry brigades, which were remnants of the VRS units which had pulled out of Drvar at the end of Operation Mistral 2. OG North moved against Novi Grad as well as towards Sanski Most on the left flank of OG Centre, against opposition from the 1st Novigrad and 11th Krupa brigades and the former Drvar garrison. OG South, stripped of all its units except the 501st Brigade, and the 17th Krajina Mountain Brigade which had been transferred from 7th Corps, was tasked with capturing Mrkonjić Grad on the right flank of OG Centre.

When the ARBiH approached Novi Grad and Sanski Most on 18–19 September, it encountered 14,000 additional VRS troops of the Prijedor OG 10 of the 1st Krajina Corps under the command of Colonel Radmilo Zeljaja, supported by 2,000 troops that had arrived from Serbia. The latter included the Serb Volunteer Guard (Srpska dobrovoljačka garda – SDG), led by Željko Ražnatović Arkan, and the special operations unit of Serbia's State Security Directorate (RDB). The 2nd Krajina Corps re-assembled behind the Prijedor OG 10 and Serbian troops. As the ARBiH approached the two towns, the HV launched Operation Una on 18 September, which involved attempts to cross the Una River at several points near Bosanska Dubica, Bosanska Kostajnica and Novi Grad opposite Dvor. The HV managed to establish several small bridgeheads on the right bank of the river, but the operation was called off after two days of fighting due to high casualties brought on by poor planning.

=== VRS counteroffensive ===
On 20–22 September, the VRS 5th Kozara and 6th Sanska brigades managed to push OG Centre back approximately six kilometres (3.7 miles), while parts of OG North had to withdraw from some areas they had captured. OG North was able to continue its advance near Novi Grad and towards Ljubija against strong resistance. On 22 September, Colonel General Ratko Mladić cut short his medical treatment in Belgrade to return to Banja Luka and control the VRS more directly. The meeting between the top VRS commanders and Mladić produced a request for general mobilisation, establishment of corps-level drumhead courts-martial, and a request for the SDG to leave the area—despite the fact that they had been invited by the Republika Srpska Ministry of the Interior and had been granted authority by Radovan Karadžić, the president of Republika Srpska. Finally, a VRS counteroffensive was ordered to regain the lost territory.

The counteroffensive commenced on the night of 23/24 September, with the VRS 65th Protection Regiment, the 16th Krajina Motorized Brigade, the 43rd Motorized Brigade, and SDG troops attacking OG North. Fighting lasted for six days and was personally overseen by Mladić. VRS forces pushed the ARBiH back to Bosanska Krupa and Otoka, but the advance had to be stopped to divert forces to defend Mrkonjić Grad. By 1 October, OG South had pushed the VRS 17th Ključ Brigade back to within three kilometres (1.9 miles) of Mrkonjić Grad. The 16th Motorised Brigade was redeployed from Bosanska Krupa to Mrkonjić Grad, under the command of Colonel Milenko Lazić's OG 2 of the 30th Division. OG 2, supported by the SDG, the Red Berets, a Bosnian Serb special police brigade, and at least one battalion of the 1st Armoured Brigade, started to drive OG South back north towards Ključ. OG South had only received one additional independent battalion from the 7th Corps as reinforcement. The reinforced VRS 5th Kozara and 6th Sanska infantry brigades (organised as the Prijedor OG) moved south from Sanski Most towards Ključ to complete a pincer movement aimed at destroying OG South. The counterattack had gained momentum by 3 October, and the VRS advanced within one kilometre (0.62 miles) of Ključ, covering seventeen kilometres (11 miles) in three days. The 16th Motorised Brigade was again redeployed, this time to reinforce VRS positions at Mount Ozren near Doboj. The remaining VRS forces, bolstered by the addition of the 2nd Reconnaissance Sabotage Detachment of the 2nd Corps, continued their attacks against Ključ, but had made only small advances by 8–9 October, as OG South had finally received more reinforcements from the 7th Corps, specifically the 707th and 717th brigades. Since Ključ was still in jeopardy, the ARBiH requested HV and HVO assistance.

=== Capture of Sanski Most ===
The HV and HVO agreed to assist the ARBiH, and launched Operation Southern Move to relieve the situation in Ključ. In this operation, the HV and the HVO fielded 11,000–12,000 troops who captured Mrkonjić Grad from three VRS brigades, thus relieving the pressure on the ARBiH in Ključ. The HV and the HVO then captured the Bočac Hydroelectric Power Station, the last remaining electrical power source available to the Bosnian Serbs in western Bosnia and Herzegovina. On 11 October, the HV and HVO reached a point on Mount Manjača, 25 kilometres (16 miles) south of Banja Luka.

By 9 October, the ARBiH 5th Corps had received approximately 10,000 troops as reinforcements, including the ARBiH Guards Brigade, the 17th Krajina Mountain, 717th Mountain, 708th Light, and 712th Mountain brigades, and the 7th Reconnaissance-Sabotage Battalion. The Guards Brigade was used to reinforce OG Centre, which also received the 501st Brigade from OG South, while the latter now comprised five brigades previously subordinated to the 7th Corps.

That day, the 5th Corps launched a fresh attack towards Sanski Most, employing OGs Centre and South to capture the town. The assault, spearheaded by the 502nd and 510th brigades, penetrated VRS defences manned by the 15th Bihać and 17th Ključ Brigades, forcing Zeljaja to withdraw his troops to the town itself to avoid encirclement. On 10 October, elements of the VRS 43rd Motorised and 11th Dubica brigades launched an unsuccessful attempt to halt the ARBiH advance on the outskirts of Sanski Most. The 502nd Brigade, the Guards Brigade and the 5th Military Police Battalion subsequently captured the town.

Despite the fact that a ceasefire was scheduled to come into force throughout Bosnia and Herzegovina on 12 October, OG Centre continued its advance northeast of Sanski Most, engaging the bulk of the VRS 43rd Motorised Brigade in a series of clashes. This fighting resulted in little change to the territory held by either side by 20 October, when fighting died down.

== Aftermath ==
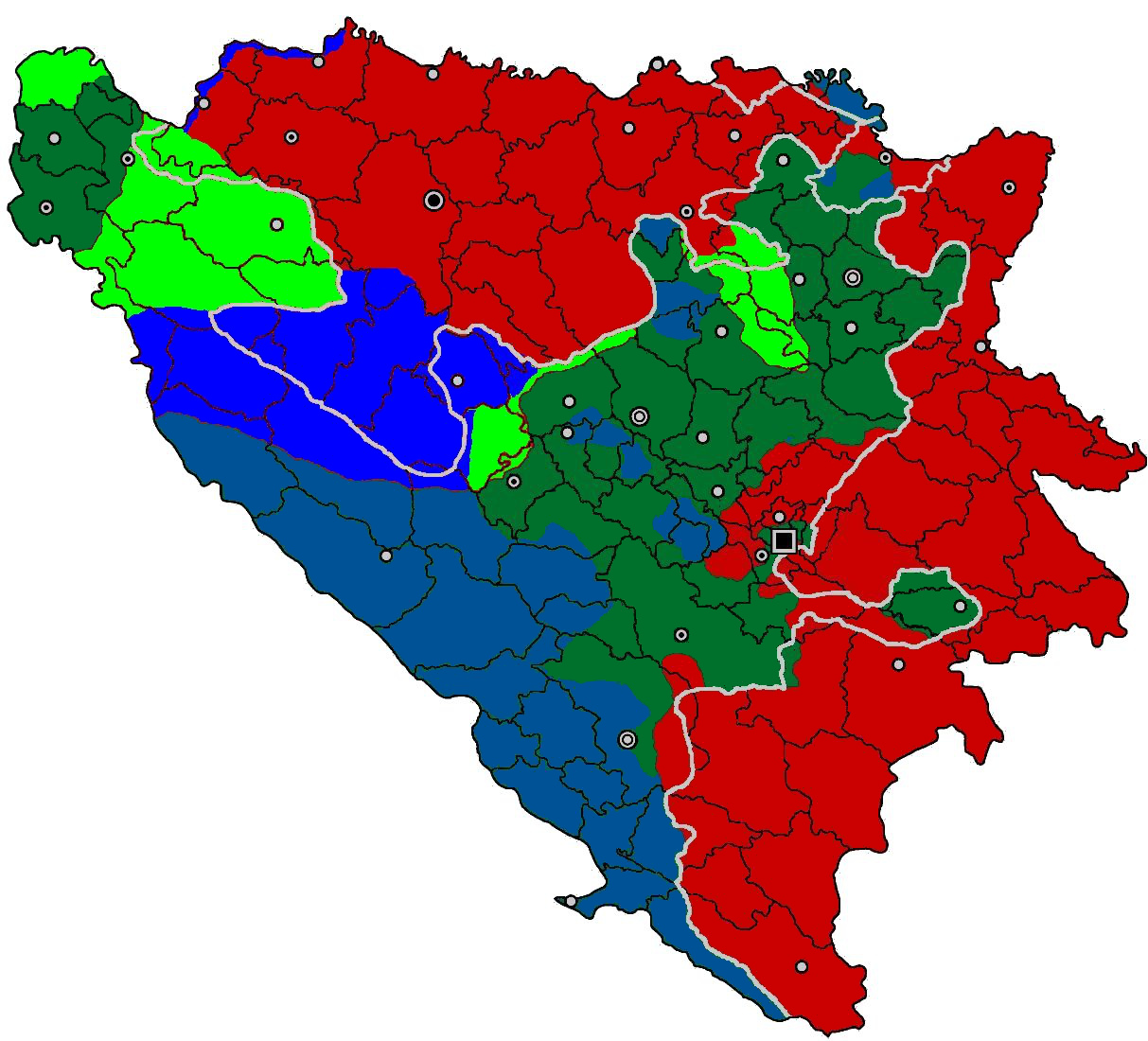
Areas captured in September–October 1995 by HV and HVO, and by ARBiH

Operation Sana, as well as Operation Mistral 2, were crucial in applying pressure on the VRS in the final weeks of the Bosnian War. A Central Intelligence Agency analysis comparing the effects of Operation Deliberate Force, Sana and Mistral 2 on the VRS noted that the NATO campaign did not degrade the combat capability of the VRS as much as was initially assumed, because the airstrikes were never primarily directed at field-deployed units, rather they targeted the command and control infrastructure of the Bosnian Serb military. The analysis concluded that, while NATO degraded the capabilities of the VRS, the final HV, HVO and ARBiH offensives inflicted the most damage. It further noted that those offensives, rather than the NATO bombing, were responsible for bringing the Bosnian Serbs to the negotiating table and ending the war. Author Robert C. Owen argues that the HV, HVO and ARBiH would not have advanced as rapidly as they did had NATO not intervened and denied the VRS its long-range communications.

Operation Sana and Operation Southern Move established the 51%–49% distribution of territory controlled by the ARBiH and HVO on the one hand and the VRS on the other, as envisaged in plans put forward by the Contact Group. The ARBiH, HVO and HV ultimately consented to the maintenance of the ceasefire of 12 October. According to British historian Marko Attila Hoare, their acquiescence was secured following massive diplomatic pressure from the West, and the alleged threat of US airstrikes against the ARBiH if it breached the ceasefire. The Bosnian War ended with the acceptance of the Dayton Agreement by all sides in November 1995.

The offensive resulted in 178 dead, 588 wounded and 41 captured ARBiH troops. Bosnian Serb losses were 900 killed and more than 1,000 wounded. In September and October, 6,500 Bosniak and Croat civilians living in the area of Banja Luka or Prijedor were expelled from their homes by Bosnian Serb forces. Changes of control of territory also allowed access to two mass graves near Sanski Most, believed to contain the bodies of 300 civilians killed by Bosnian Serb forces in April 1992.

Operation Sana, along with the near-concurrent Operation Mistral 2, created a large number of Serb refugees from the areas previously controlled by the VRS. Bosnian Serb sources document approximately 40,000 refugees in September 1995, encompassing the entire contemporary Bosnian Serb populations of the towns of Jajce, Šipovo, Mrkonjić Grad and Donji Vakuf having fled or been evacuated. At the time, the UN spokesman in Sarajevo estimated the number of refugees at 20,000. Fighting in October caused a further 30,000–40,000 refugees to flee Sanski Most and another 10,000 to flee Mrkonjić Grad and its surroundings.
