= Operation Spider =

Military operation during the Bosnian War

- Part of the Bosnian War and Intra-Bosnian Muslim War
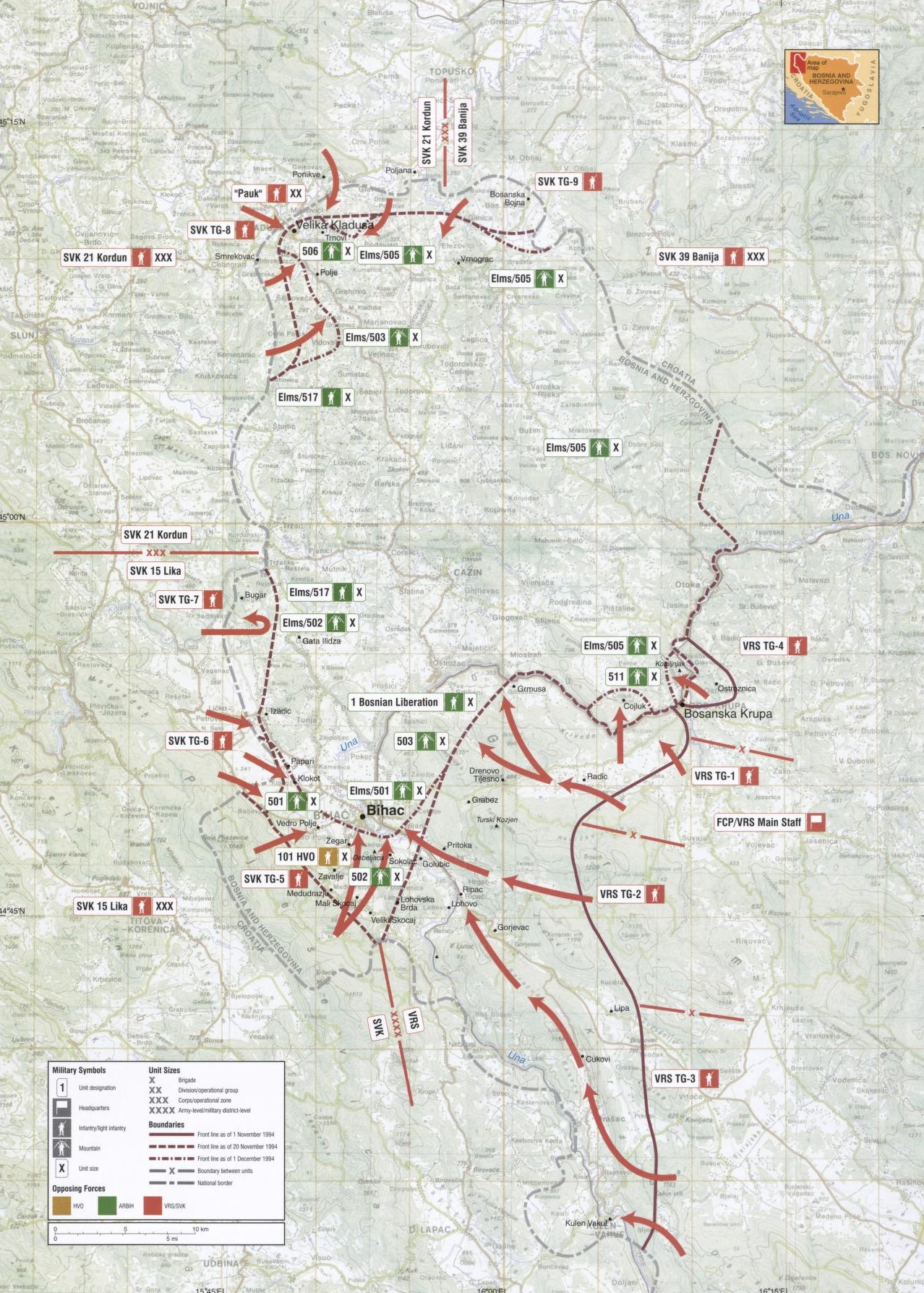
- Army movements during Operation Spider
Date	16 November – 17 December 1994
Location	Velika Kladuša, Autonomous Province of Western Bosnia 45°11′N 15°48′E
Result	VRS and NOZB victory: The APZB is re-established; NOZB takes back Velika Kladuša and around 20 villages

Belligerents
Western Bosnia; Republika Srpska; Republic of Serbian Krajina	Bosnia and Herzegovina

Commanders and leaders
Republika Srpska; Franko Simatović; Jovica Stanišić; Serbian Krajina; Mile Novaković	Atif Dudaković; Izet Nanić; Jasmin Kulenović

Units involved
National Defence of the APZB; Army of Republika Srpska; 1st Krajina Corps; Special Operations Unit; Serb Volunteer Guard; Scorpions; Army of Serbian Krajina; 15th Lika Corps; 21st Kordun Corps; 39th Banija Corps	Army of the Republic of Bosnia and Herzegovina; 5th Corps; 503rd Famous Mountain Brigade; 505th Bužim Brigade; 506th Liberation Brigade; 517th Light Brigade

Strength
5,000 NOZB; 2,500 SVK; 500 SDG	10,000

Casualties and losses
Unknown	Unknown

Operation Spider (Serbo-Croatian: Operacija Pauk, Операција Паук) were a series of military actions in northwestern Bosnia that began in November 1994 and continued until December 1994. It was a combined effort of Republika Srpska and the Republic of Serb Krajina to recover the territory of the Autonomous Province of Western Bosnia (APZB), which was a key ally of the Serbs. Franko Simatović and Jovica Stanišić commanded the offensive. The Bosnian central government had previously overrun and seized the territory. The offensive ended in a Serb victory and the Autonomous Province of Western Bosnia remained in existence until the fall of its key ally, the Republic of Serbian Krajina, and the subsequent end of the war.

== Background ==
The Army of the Republic of Bosnia and Herzegovina (ARBiH) 5th corps, under Bosnian general Atif Dudaković and Hamdija Abdić, conducted an offensive into the Autonomous Province of Western Bosnia on August 21, 1994, and completely overrun the entire province on August 22, 1994. During this offensive, around 40,000 Muslims loyal to Fikret Abdić fled to the Republic of Serbian Krajina. Fikret Abdić, the former president of the APZB, had already fled to Croatia (Republic of Serbian Krajina), where he stayed until his province was liberated and restored.

== Prelude ==
After Abdić’s forces had been defeated and dispersed from their “capital” in August, most of his supporters and former soldiers fled into the RSK, settling in refugee camps in UN Sector North, southeast of Karlovac. On 8 November, UN observers noted that the SVK had begun recruiting able-bodied Muslim males from among the refugees. The SVK was reforming some 4,000–5,000 of Abdić’s troops into three brigades: 1st Velika Kladuša, 2nd Cazin, and 3rd Vrnograč Brigades. On 10 November, the new formations began taking up positions along the RSK border near Velika Kladuša.

In actual command of these puppet troops was a newly formed Operational Group “Pauk” (Spider) commanded by SVK Major General Mile Novaković and Serbian State Security Department (RDB) Colonel “Raja” Bozović, a veteran special operations officer. A key deputy of RDB chief Jovica Stanišić, Franko Simatović “Frenki”, oversaw Novaković and Bozović's work. To stiffen the Abdić units—as well as allied SVK ground forces—Novaković and Božović could call on a bevy of elite Yugoslav Army, Serbian RDB and Serb Volunteer Guard (SDG) troops. Elements of the VJ’s 63rd Airborne Brigade and the Corps of Special Units, plus Simatovic’s “Red Berets”, as well as elements of the SDG—probably about 500 troops combined—were to provide the spearhead for the APWB attack.

== Timeline ==
On 16 November, this new army attacked across the border toward Velika Kladuša. Abdić’s reconstructed force amounted to some 4,000 to 5,000 troops, bolstered by about 2,500 SVK troops in two tactical groups and some 500 Yugoslav Army and Serbian RDB/MUP special operations troops, under the command of SVK Major General Mile Novaković and Serbian RDB Colonel “Raja” Bozović. The few 5th Corps formations put up a stiff defense as the Serb/NOZB forces lapped around both ARBiH flanks on the north and south sides of Velika Kladuša in an attempt to pinch it off.

During the first two weeks of December, SVK/NOZB forces led by the Serbian special operations troops hammered 5th Corps positions and inched forward against a tenacious defense. The Serb commanders’ objective remained to force the ARBiH from the town with a pincer movement rather than a frontal assault. On 15–16 December the joint Serb/NOZB units seized key high ground overlooking the main 5th Corps supply line into the town. This forced the remaining ARBIH troops to withdraw to avoid being cut off. By 17 December Velika Kladuša was under Serb/NOZB control. Although battles were to continue throughout the enclave for over a week—until the implementation of the nationwide cease-fire negotiated by former US President Jimmy Carter—the fall of Velika Kladuša was the last major action of the campaign.

== Aftermath ==
The aftermath of this operation left the 5th Corps still encircled by the APZB, the Republic of Serbian Krajina, and the Republika Srpska. This encirclement continued until Operation Storm, when the Republic of Serbian Krajina—a key ally to the APZB—was defeated in August 1995, marking a huge turning point for the Bosnian War and Croatian War of Independence. The APZB had no strength to take on the Bosnian Army, and were completely overrun by the 5th Corps in just one day, with Velika Kladuša being taken when Operation Storm ended on August 7, 1995.

Operation Spider and Operation Storm left many towns forever destroyed and ruined, most of which were on the frontlines of the conflict. There are about 8 ruined towns in the area: 3 next to Bihać, 1–2 next to Velika Kladuša, and 2–3 in the middle of the area.

== Sources ==
- Balkan Battlegrounds: A Military History of the Yugoslav Conflict. Vol. 1. Central Intelligence Agency, Office of Russian and European Analysis. 2002. ISBN 9780160664724.
- Balkan Battlegrounds: A Military History of the Yugoslav Conflict. Vol. 2. Central Intelligence Agency, Office of Russian and European Analysis. 2003. ISBN 9780160664724.
- Vukušić, Iva (2022). Serbian Paramilitaries and the Breakup of Yugoslavia: State Connections and Patterns of Violence. London; New York: Routledge, Taylor & Francis Group. 9780367690639.
