= Atif Dudaković =

Bosnian general (born 1953)

- Born: 2 December 1954 (age 71); Orahova, Bosanska Gradiška, PR Bosnia and Herzegovina, Yugoslavia
- Military career
- Allegiance: Yugoslavia (1976–1992); Bosnia and Herzegovina (after 1992)
- Branch: Yugoslav People's Army (1976–1992); Army of Bosnia and Herzegovina (after 1992)
- Rank: Major (Yugoslavia); Lieutenant general (Bosnia and Herzegovina)
- Commands: Commander of the 5th Corps
- Conflicts: Croatian War of Independence: Battle of Šibenik; Battle of Drniš; Bosnian War: Intra-Bosnian Muslim War; Siege of Bihać; Battle of Velika Kladuša; Ambush near Cazin; Operation Tiger; Operation Spider; Capture of Vrnograč; Operation Sword–1; Operation Storm; Operation Pećigrad '94; Operation Grmeč; Operation Zora; Operation Breza '94; Operation Shield '94; Operation Sana; Operation Prijedor '95

Atif Dudaković (born 2 December 1953) is a retired Bosniak general who served in the Army of Republic of Bosnia and Herzegovina. During the Bosnian War, Dudaković was in command of the Bihać enclave, which was surrounded and besieged from 1992 to 1995, commanding the 5th Corps. After the war he became the general commander of the Army of the Federation of Bosnia and Herzegovina. In 2018, he was charged with war crimes.

== Early life and education ==
Dudaković was born in the village of Orahova near Bosanska Gradiška. He graduated from the Military High School in Zadar and in 1976 from the Military Academy, majoring in artillery. He later taught at an artillery school in Zadar and military academy in Belgrade.

== Career ==
In 1991, at the beginning of the Croatian War of Independence, he served as the artillery superintendent of the 9th Corps of the Yugoslav People's Army (JNA) with headquarters in Knin, and was directly subordinated to the Serb General Ratko Mladić.

After the outbreak of the war in Bosnia, Dudaković joined the newly established Army of the Republic of Bosnia and Herzegovina (ARBiH). Eventually he became commander of the 5th Corps, defending Bihać. The situation there was difficult as Bihać was surrounded on all sides by enemies of the ARBiH: by the Army of Republika Srpska; by Republic of Serb Krajina; and by forces of the Autonomous Province of Western Bosnia, the renegade Bosniak forces of Fikret Abdić. The 5th Corps successfully defended the enclave and in 1995 broke out from the encirclement and captured the towns of Bosanski Petrovac, Bosanska Krupa, Ključ and Sanski Most.

After the war he continued to serve in the Bosnian army, holding the position of Commander of Joint Command of Army of the Federation of Bosnia and Herzegovina.

In September 2006, the Serbian television stations B92 and Radio Television of Serbia broadcast two video tapes, one of which apparently shows Dudaković giving an order of "fire" or "burn it all" referring to a Serb village during Operation Sana in 1995. The other showed the execution of a Serb civilian who had raised his arms in surrender. After the video was released Dudaković gave a statement saying:

The Army of the Republic of Bosnia-Herzegovina was never ordered to commit crimes. If such things happened, then there should be an investigation and the perpetrators punished. ... The film shows the front line. I was normally engaged on the front line directing the artillery. I am an artillery man. The film with its subtitles are the usual product of Serb propaganda which we came across throughout the war and later too. This is why I do not get excited.

In 2009, Bosnian Serb television broadcast a video purporting to implicate Dudaković in the execution of two Bosniak prisoners of wars who were loyal to wartime foe Fikret Abdić.

In 2010, Dudaković joined the Party for Bosnia and Herzegovina of Haris Silajdžić.

=== War crimes charges ===
In April 2018, police detained Atif Dudaković and 12 others on suspicion of committing crimes against humanity during the Bosnian War. All were members of the Bosnian Army's 5th Corps, which under Dudaković's leadership was in charge of the Bihac area. They were suspected of having carried out atrocities against civilians including ethnic Serbs and Bosniaks, who were loyal to other Bosnian leaders, and prisoners during the war. The case against them was based on more than 100 witness interviews, video footage and evidence from exhumations. Bosniaks rallied in Sarajevo, carried a large banner reading "Heroes, not criminals!", to express their support to them. Dudaković and the others are accused of killing over 300 civilians and the destruction of 38 Serb Orthodox churches. In October 2018, Dudaković was formally indicted for crimes against humanity. No verdict has been handed down in the case.

== Military ranks ==
JNA

- Major (1988)

ARBiH

- Brigadier
- Brigadier general (21 August 1994)
- Division general (7 August 1995)
- Lieutenant general
