= 501st Brigade (ARBiH) =

501st Famous Mountain Brigade of ARBiH
- 501. slavna brdska brigada
- Active: 19 July 1992-1995
- Country: Bosnia and Herzegovina
- Branch: Army of the Republic of Bosnia and Herzegovina
- Type: Infantry
- Garrison/HQ: Eastern Bihać

Commanders
- Current commander: Senad Šarganović; Sead Duraković

The 501st Famous Mountain Brigade (Bosnian: 501. slavna brdska brigada) was formed on July 19, 1992, as the First Bihać Infantry Brigade in Kamenica near Bihać, with the aim of defending Bihać and its surroundings from Serbian attacks. Although the brigade had no problems with the number of men, the main problem of this brigade and the entire Army of the Republic of Bosnia and Herzegovina was the lack of weapons and military equipment, despite its contribution during the War in Bosnia and Herzegovina was extremely significant and large.

== History ==
The brigade was formed shortly after the first attacks on the city of Bihać, and the first combat tasks were to defend the first line of defense around Bihać. During the first half of the war, the brigade did not have significant offensive actions, the main actions were of a defensive nature with the aim of preventing the city from falling into the hands of the aggressors. Significant operations in which the brigade gave its contribution were the liberation of Grabež, Ripač, and other settlements in Operation Grabež 94, followed by operations: Winter 94, Morning, Spider, Ripač 95, Sana 95.

== Organization ==
The 501st Famous Mountain Brigade was formed on July 19, 1992, at the very beginning of the attack by Bosnian Serb paramilitary formations on the besieged Bihać district, which gained its true shape and intensity in the following days. The brigade was composed of young volunteers from the Bihać municipality and new refugees from the surrounding occupied territory. When forming the brigade, it consisted of:

- 1st Detachment TO Ljutoč
- 2nd Detachment TO Center
- 3rd detachment TO Bakšajš
- mortar platoon from the Municipal Headquarters TO Bihać
- part of the reconnaissance platoon from the Municipal Headquarters of the Bihać TO

On the day of the formation, there were 85 officiers, 125 non-commissioned officers and 1131 fighters.

== Command ==
On the day of the formation of the brigade, it was structured as follows:

- Commander: Senad Sarganović
- Chief of Staff: Izet Pajić
- Assistant for morale, IPD and VP: Senudin Jašarević
- Security Assistant: Kasim Ćurtović
- Assistant for logistics: Ekrem Šiljdedić
- Assistant for filling and personal affairs: Nedib Hodžić

== Losses and Decorations ==
The 501st brigade had 307 dead, 1763 wounded, 69 missing or captured and 518 injured or a total of 2657 soldiers. 29 soldiers are "Zlatni Ljiljani" - recipients of the Order of the Golden Lily.
