= 1st Croatian Guards Corps =

Special formation of the Croatian Army

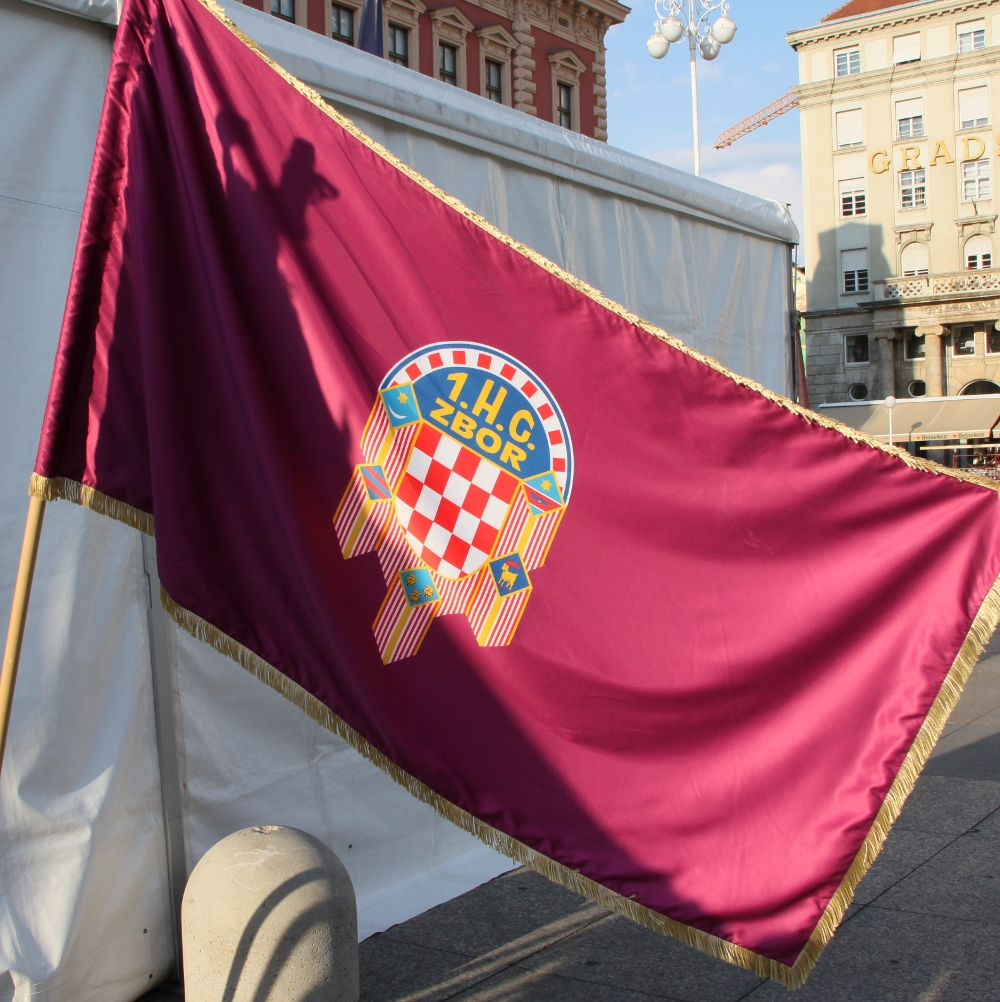
- Corps flag, bearing corps shoulder sleeve insignia
- Active: 1994–2000
- Country: Croatia
- Type: Special forces
- Size: 2,500
- Garrison/HQ: Zagreb
- Engagements: Croatian War of Independence: Operation Winter '94; Operation Flash; Operation Leap 2; Operation Summer '95; Operation Storm; Bosnian War: Operation Mistral 2; Operation Southern Move

Commanders
- Notable commanders: Mile Ćuk; Miljenko Filipović

The 1st Croatian Guards Corps (Croatian: 1. hrvatski gardijski zbor) was a special formation of the Croatian Army (Hrvatska vojska – HV) directly subordinated to the Ministry of Defence rather than the General Staff of the Armed Forces of the Republic of Croatia and reporting directly to the President of Croatia. The corps was established in 1994 by the amalgamation of various HV special forces. The 2,500-strong unit was organised into the 1st Croatian Guards Brigade (1. hrvatski gardijski zdrug – HGZ), a multi-purpose special forces combat unit, and four battalions tasked with ensuring the security of the President of Croatia and carrying out ceremonial duties. The HGZ took part in a number of military operations during the Croatian War of Independence and the Bosnian War. It was disbanded in 2000, when its components were amalgamated with other HV units to form the Special Operations Battalion, the 350th Military Intelligence Battalion, and the Honour Guard Battalion.

== Establishment ==
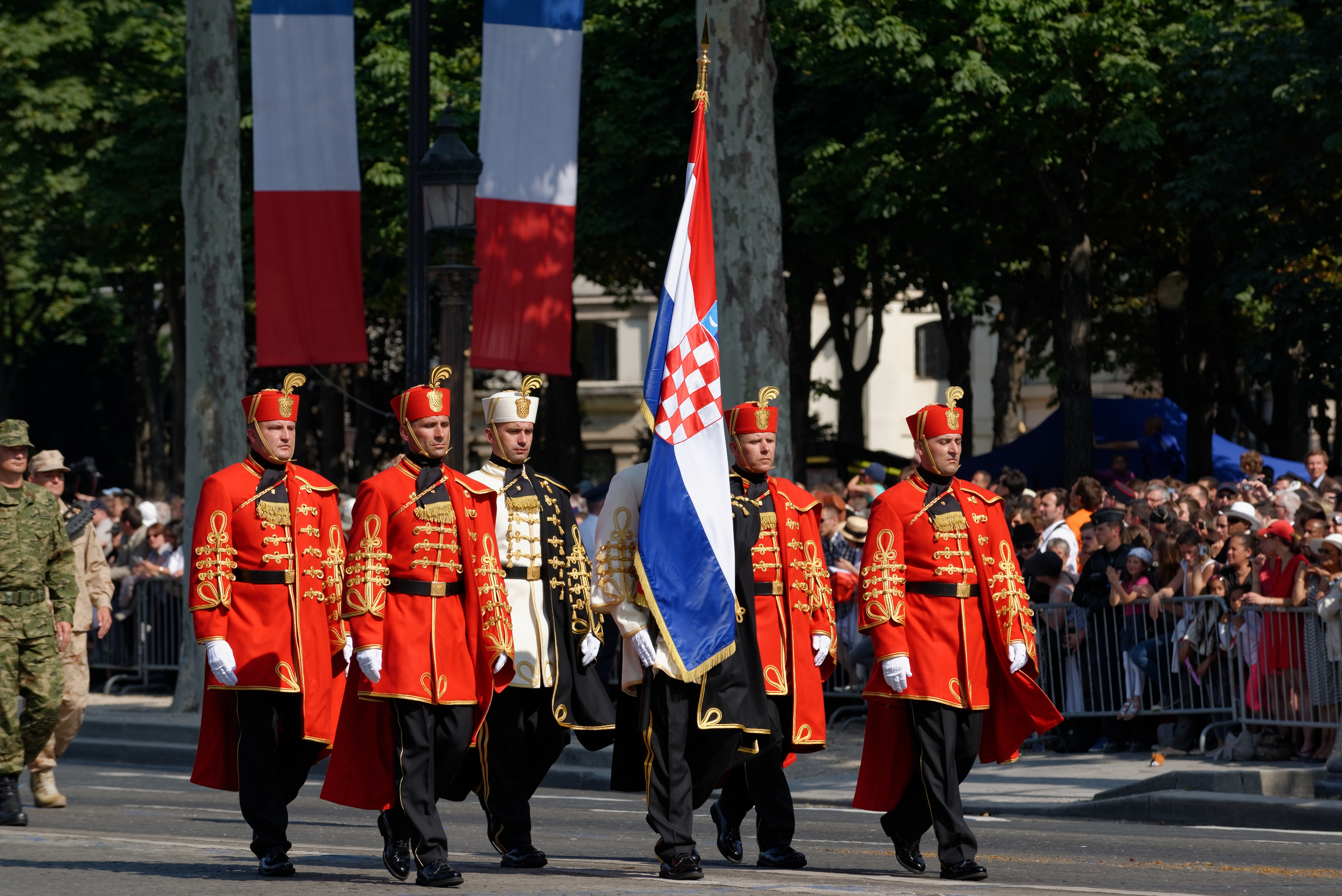
Honour Guard Battalion troops wearing dress uniforms first used by the 1st Guards Honour Battalion

On 25 February 1994, the special forces of the Croatian Army (Hrvatska vojska – HV) were reorganised when all HV's special forces units were combined to form the 1st Croatian Guards Corps (1. hrvatski gardijski zbor). In April, personnel of the 8th Military Police Light Assault Brigade (itself only established in September 1993) were also transferred to the corps, ultimately making the corps 2,500-strong. In addition to special forces operations, the corps was also tasked with providing security for the President of Croatia. The corps was organised into four specialised battalions and the 1st Croatian Guards Brigade (1. hrvatski gardijski zdrug – HGZ), a multi-purpose special forces combat unit. The HGZ was considered the elite unit of the HV. The entire corps was directly subordinated to the Ministry of Defence rather than the General Staff of the Armed Forces of the Republic of Croatia, and reported directly to the president. It was commanded by Major General Mile Ćuk. Ćuk and his deputy were based in the Presidential Palace, while the bulk of the corps was based in nearby Tuškanac barracks. The HGZ was capable of fielding up to 300 troops in combat. It was commanded by Colonel (later Major General) Miljenko Filipović, who had previously commanded the Zrinski Battalion—one of the special forces units amalgamated into the corps.

Croatian Guards Corps order of battle
Unit	Purpose
1st Croatian Guards Brigade	Multi-purpose special forces unit; the brigade included a parachute battalion, an armoured-mechanised battalion, an electronic warfare battalion and a mixed aviation squadron.
1st Guards Honour Battalion	Honour guard unit, used in ceremonial occasions, wearing dress uniforms
2nd Guards Assault Battalion	Presidential guard unit, wearing battledress
3rd Guards Naval Honour Assault Battalion	Presidential guard and honour guard unit, headquartered on Brijuni Islands
4th Guards Special Purpose Battalion	Plain clothes bodyguards; The battalion included a motorcycle honour guards platoon.

== Combat service ==
The HGZ took part in several battles of the Croatian War of Independence and the Bosnian War. In late November and December 1994, it participated in Operation Winter '94, the joint offensive of the HV and the Croatian Defence Council (Hrvatsko vijeće obrane – HVO) which pushed the Army of Republika Srpska (Vojska Republike Srpske – VRS) from the western parts of the Livanjsko field in Bosnia and Herzegovina. Elements of the HGZ also saw action along the Novska–Okučani axis of advance in the HV's Operation Flash offensive that took place in western Slavonia in early May 1995. By this time, the HGZ also commanded its own artillery and Mil Mi-24 helicopter gunships, in addition to Mil Mi-8 transport helicopters. The HGZ redeployed west of Livno once again in early June to take part in Operation Leap 2, extending the salient that had been created in late 1994 west towards Bosansko Grahovo and Glamoč. The unit participated in the capture of those towns in late July 1995 during Operation Summer '95.

In preparation for Operation Storm, the HV 4th Guards and 7th Guards Brigades were pulled back from positions facing the VRS that had been established during Operation Summer '95, and were reoriented south towards the Army of the Republic of Serb Krajina (ARSK). The ARSK was protecting the northern approaches to Knin − the capital of the unrecognised Republic of Serbian Krajina − which Croatia claimed as part of its own territory. As the two brigades turned over the positions north and west of Bosansko Grahovo to the HV 81st Guards Battalion, the HGZ was deployed to the rear of the battalion, tasked with intervening in case of any VRS attack towards Bosansko Grahovo. On the second day of the operation, 6 August, after Knin was captured by the HV, the HGZ was airlifted from the Livanjsko field to the village of Rovanjska north of Zadar. They then linked up with the 2nd Battalion of the 9th Guards Brigade and advanced east to capture the villages of Muškovac and Kaštel Žegarski. On 8 August, the HGZ participated in an operation against the last significant ARSK pocket in the area of Donji Lapac and Srb, alongside the three guards brigades and special police forces.

In September 1995, the HGZ took part in Operation Mistral 2, which extended HV and HVO control in western Bosnia and Herzegovina and captured the towns of Jajce, Šipovo and Drvar, moving the confrontation line north towards the Bosnian Serb capital of Banja Luka. In October, the HGZ also participated in Operation Southern Move, which captured the town of Mrkonjić Grad, and reached the southern slopes of Mount Manjača, 25 kilometres (16 miles) south of Banja Luka.

== Reorganisation ==
The corps was disbanded in 2000 and its constituents reorganised. A part of the HGZ was amalgamated with the Special Combat Skills Centre Šepurine to form the Special Operations Battalion. The remainder of the brigade was amalgamated with the Reconnaissance-Sabotage Company based in Pula, the 350th Sabotage Detachment, the 280th Unmanned Aerial Vehicle Platoon, and the 275th Electronic Warfare Company to form the 350th Military Intelligence Battalion. The elements of the corps which were tasked with security of the President of Croatia and ceremonial duties were reformed and the Honour Guard Battalion was established in their place.
