= 9th Grahovo Brigade =

9th Grahovo Brigade: 9. граховска лака пјешадијска бригада; 9. grahovska laka pješadijska brigada
- Active: 1992—1996
- Country: Republika Srpska
- Allegiance: Army of Republika Srpska
- Branch: Ground forces
- Type: Light infantry
- Size: 1,000–1,800
- Part of: 2nd Krajina Corps
- Garrison/HQ: Bosansko Grahovo
- Engagements: Operation Winter '94; Operation Leap 1 Operation Leap 2 Operation Summer '95; Operation Mistral 2 Operation Vaganj 95

Commanders
- Notable commanders: Milan Pavlović; Gojko Ivetić; Simeun Despanić; Slobodan Šobić; Milorad Vulin; Božidar Rakić

9th Grahovo Brigade (Serbian: 9. grahovska laka pješadijska brigada; 9. граховска лака пјешадијска бригада; 9th Grahovo light infantry brigade) was a light infantry brigade of the 2nd Krajina Corps of the Army of Republika Srpska founded in 1992 in Bosansko Grahovo during the Bosnian War. The Croatian offensive Operation Summer '95 destroyed most of the brigade, leaving only remnants of the brigade. During the war, the brigade lost 186 soldiers.

== Sources ==
- Central Intelligence Agency, Office of Russian and European Analysis (2002). Balkan Battlegrounds: A Military History of the Yugoslav Conflict, 1990–1995. Washington, D.C.: Central Intelligence Agency. ISBN 9780160664724. OCLC 50396958.
- Nježić, Dejan. Други крајишки корпус Војске Републике Српске (in Serbian). ISBN 978-99976-730-5-3.
