= Military Intelligence Battalion (Croatia) =

- Vojnoobavještajna bojna
- Active: 2000–2014
- Country: Croatia
- Branch: Croatian Army
- Role: Military Intelligence
- Size: Battalion

Military Intelligence Battalion (MIB) (Croatian: Vojnoobavještajna bojna, VOb) was an intelligence unit of the Croatian Army which served as support to all other units of the Armed Forces of Croatia. It was established in 2000 during restructuring of Armed Forces when 350th Sabotage Detachment of General Staff, 1st Reconnaissance and Sabotage company of GS "Anguilla", 74th Engineer Company of GS, 280th UAV Platoon of GS as well as 1st Croatian Guards, and acted as 350th Military Intelligence Battalion until 2007.

Military Intelligence Battalion was formed by ISTAR concept and had four basic intelligence disciplines: HUMINT, SIGINT, OSINT and IMINT.

Members of the Military Intelligence Battalion were trained for airborne assaults, reconnaissance behind enemy lines, control of UAVs, reconnaissance and jamming of opponent's radio communications, climbing and sabotage actions. Monitoring and recording of target, collection and selection of data, avoiding contact and stealth extraction were only a few of tasks of members of MIB.

In 2014, MIB was merged with the Electronic Surveillance Center (Croatian: Središnjica elektroničkog izviđanja) into a new unit, Intelligence Operations Center (Croatian: Središnjica za obavještajno djelovanje).

== Training and selection ==
Each company of the MIB required the specific kind of people with certain specialties. During training, candidate's physical and intellectual abilities were put to test.
