= 4th Guards Brigade (Croatia) =

4th Guards Brigade "Spiders"
- Četvrta Gardijska Brigada "Pauci"
- Active: 1991 – 2008
- Disbanded: Reorganized into the 3rd mechanized battalion of the Motorized Guard Brigade in 2008
- Country: Croatia
- Allegiance: Croatian National Guard Armed Forces of Croatia
- Branch: Croatian Army
- Type: Motorised Infantry
- Size: Brigade
- Nickname: Četvrta (Fourth) during the war Pauci (The Spiders) after the war
- Motto: In hoc signo vinces
- Colors: Black, scarlet
- March: Poklonimo se Domovini
- Anniversaries: 28 April
- Engagements: Croatian War of Independence; Operation Raseljka; Battle of Šibenik; Battle of Zadar; Operation Jackal; Operation Tiger; Operation Maslenica; Operation Winter '94; Operation Summer '95; Operation Storm; Bosnia War; Operation Mistral; Operation Southern Move

Commanders
- Notable commanders: Ante Kotromanović Damir Krstičević

4th Guards Brigade "Spiders" (Croatian: Četvrta gardijska brigada "Pauci") was a brigade of the Croatian Army which took part in the Croatian War of Independence. It was one of the best-known units in the war and it was active until a 2008 reorganization when it was merged into the Motorized Guard Brigade.

== Name ==
Nicknamed the Spiders (Croatian: Pauci; singular: Pauk), the brigade was named after one of its commanders, General Andrija Matijaš Pauk, who was killed by in fighting with Army of Republika Srpska forces in Mrkonjić Grad, Bosnia and Herzegovina on 9 October 1995, during Operation Southern Move, the final action of the Croatian army in the war. The 4th Guards Brigade took his nickname for the unit soon after.

== Formation ==
The 4th Guards Brigade was founded on 28 April 1991 as part of the formation of a Croatian National Guard at the beginning of the Croatian War of Independence. At first, the brigade was composed of young policemen (130 of them) who had left the police to receive military training for special purposes in Kumrovec under the command of the Ministry of Internal Affairs. A majority of them were from Livno, Tomislavgrad, Kupres, Široki Brijeg, Trebižat, Ljubuški, Stolac and Bugojno in Western Herzegovina and Central Bosnia. They arrived in Split on 30 May 1991 and settled in Hotel Split. From Hotel Split they moved their headquarters to Hotel Resnik in Resnik. There, the brigade's first battalion was founded, under the command of Gento Međugorac, whose deputy was Ivan Zelić. Within the battalion, a first company (named the "2nd Company") was formed from the first members of the brigade, under the command of Ilko Pavlović, while the commander of the second company (named the "1st Company") was Joško Macan. Soon afterwards, they received volunteers from Kaštela and other places, which enabled the formation of a 3rd company commanded by Mario Udiljak. Part of the brigade went to Imotski to form and reinforce the 3rd battalion, part of them went to Vrlika and Sinj to form and reinforce the 2nd battalion, and the other part went to Metković and Dubrovnik to form a unit in those two towns. The 2nd Company was, formally, without soldiers, who got an order to disband Yugoslav People's Army, form a unit and go to their first task in Kruševo near Zadar.

== War ==
The 4th Guards Brigade was one of the units which was not trained, so they gained their skills during the war. The slogan of the brigade was "In hoc signo vinces" ('By this sign, conquer'). Their first task was to liberate Kruševo near Zadar which they did in July 1991. Soon, the brigade was involved in defence and liberation actions from Zadar, Sinj, Drniš, Šibenik, Vodice until the liberation of Dubrovnik and region in Operations Tiger and Vlaštica. After the liberation of Dubrovnik and actions in the Southern Front, the unit was involved in Operation Maslenica which they finished successfully. After Operation Maslenica, the brigade was involved in Operation Winter '94, Operation Leap 1, Operation Leap 2, Operation Summer '95, Operation Storm and Operation Maestral.

The 4th Guards Brigade was famous because it never lost a battle or position, so Croatian Defence Minister, Gojko Šušak stated that "the Croatian Army has 7 guard brigades in its composition, which are well-trained and well-armed, but only one brigade is a shock brigade, and that is 4th Guards Brigade."

During the Croatian War of Independence, 193 members of this brigade were killed, and their pictures were added to the memorial site in the Sveti križ chapel of the Dračevac barracks in Split. During its existence, the brigade changed number of commanders: Generals Ivo Jelić, Mirko Šundov, and Damir Krstičević were war commanders, while peacetime commanders were Brigadiers Ante Kotromanović, Zvonko Asanović, Blaž Beretin, and Mladen Fuzul.

== Reorganization ==
Following a reorganization of the Croatian Army, the 4th Brigade was downsized to battalion size becoming the 2nd Motorized Battalion "Spiders" of the Motorized Guard Brigade. The Motorized Guard Brigade is composed of several other units, the 1st Guards Brigade (the "Tigers"), the 2nd Guards Brigade (the "Thunders") and the 9th Guards Brigade (the "Wolves"), which have similarly been downsized. This was done to preserve unit histories and lineages rather than just disbanding the excess brigades.

== Veterans' association ==
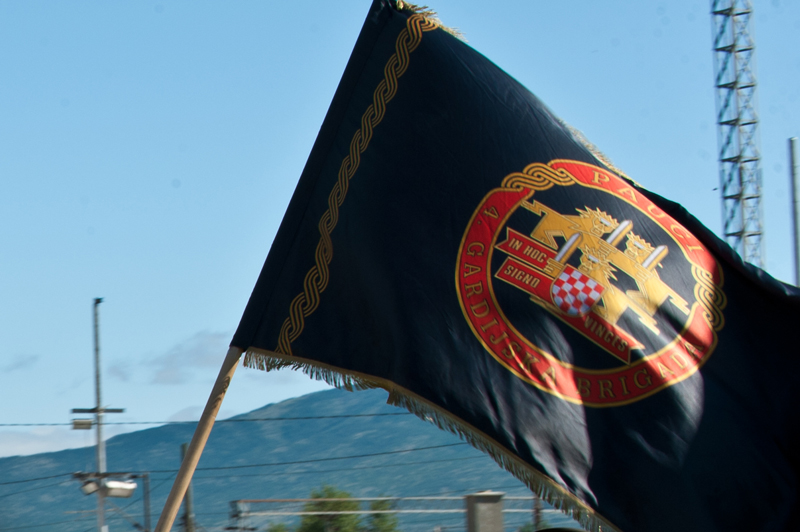
16th anniversary of the Operation Storm in Knin

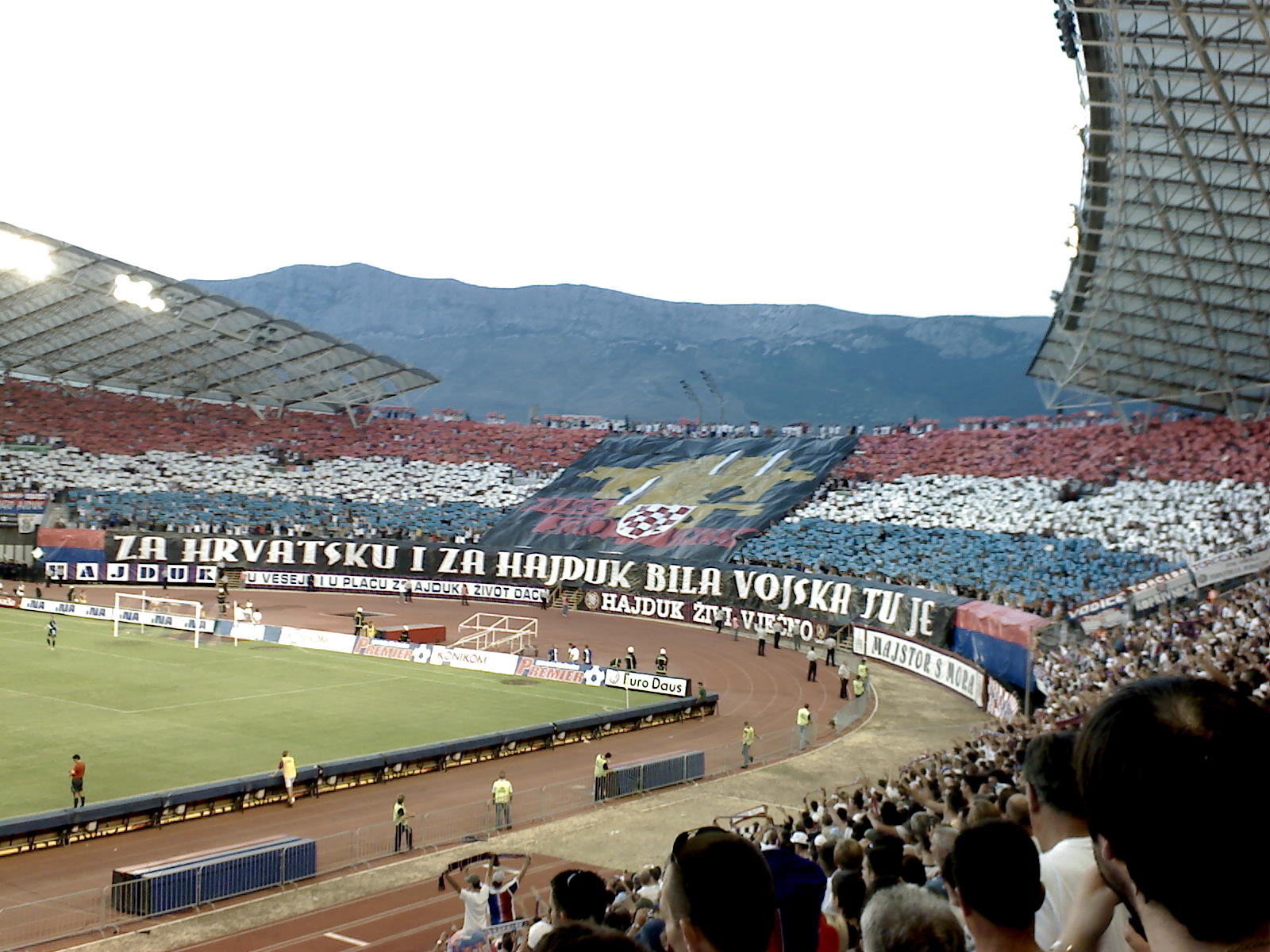
Hajduk's fan club Torcida salutes to 4th Guard Brigade of Croatian Army

Memorial to 4th Guard Brigade soldiers fallen during the Croatian War of Independence, Split

War veterans of the 4th Guards Brigade founded the Association of Veterans' of the 4th Guards Brigade on 21 June 2007. They mark various anniversaries, organize veterans' meetings, professional teams for health relief, social and other difficulties for veterans. The President of the association is Božo Zadro.

== March song ==
Poklonimo se Domovini

| Croatian | English |
|---|---|
| Resnik ih skupi ko' draga mati na zov Domovine. I mladost jurnu na put do sunca, slobodu braniti. Bije boj za mir, za san, ide četvrta, stupa noć i dan. Kruševo i Sinj Unešić i Ston. Križni put je to, pobjeda i tron. Ide četvrta na dušmana, zove Domovina. Padoše mnogi za mir svet, poklonimo se. Spokoj svim zemlja neka im da, svim junacima. Jer ostvaren je tisućljetni san, sad Hrvatska je tu. Neka zvone zvona pobjede za Domovinu. | Resnik had gathered them like a dear mother at the Homeland's call. And the youth rushed on the path to the Sun, to defend freedom. They fight a battle for peace, for a dream, The 4th Brigade goes, marches by night and day. Kruševo and Sinj Unešić and Ston. It's a Way of the Cross, victory and throne. The 4th Brigade attacks the enemy, The Homeland is calling. Many have fallen for sacred peace, let's have a bow. Let the country give peace to all, to all heroes. For a thousand-year old dream has come true, Croatia is here now. Let the bells of victory ring for the Homeland. |

== See also ==
- Croatian National Guard
