= Operation Southern Move =

1995 Bosnian War battle

Coordinates: 44.41°N 17.09°E

- Part of the Bosnian War
- Objectives of Operation Southern Move on the map of Bosnia and Herzegovina
Date	8–11 October 1995
Location	Western Bosnia and Herzegovina
Result	Croatian victory
Territorial changes	Town of Mrkonjić Grad captured City of Banja Luka threatened

Belligerents
Croatia; Herzeg-Bosnia	Republika Srpska

Commanders and leaders
(Croatia) Ante Gotovina (Croatia) Andrija Matijaš †	(Republika Srpska) Milenko Lazić

Units involved
Croatian Army; Croatian Defence Council; Police of Herzeg-Bosnia	Army of Republika Srpska

Strength
11,000–12,000 troops	5,500 troops

Casualties and losses
- See Aftermath section

Operation Southern Move (Croatian: Operacija Južni potez) was the final Croatian Army (HV) and Croatian Defence Council (HVO) offensive of the Bosnian War. It took place in western Bosnia and Herzegovina on 8–11 October 1995. Its goal was to help the Army of the Republic of Bosnia and Herzegovina (ARBiH) whose positions around the town of Ključ, captured by them during Operation Sana, were endangered by a counteroffensive by the Army of Republika Srpska (VRS). The objectives of Operation Southern Move included the capture of the town of Mrkonjić Grad and positions on the Manjača Mountain which would allow the HV and the HVO to directly threaten Banja Luka, the largest city controlled by Bosnian Serbs. Finally, the offensive was also aimed at capturing the Bočac Hydroelectric Power Station, the last significant source of electricity under VRS control in western Bosnia and Herzegovina. The combined HV and HVO forces were under the overall command of HV Major General Ante Gotovina.

The offensive achieved its objectives, and significantly contributed, along with Operations Sana and Maestral 2, to forcing the Bosnian Serb leadership to serious peace negotiations. The offensive also contributed to the displacement of 10,000 Bosnian Serb refugees and resulted in the deaths of at least 181 Serbs while hundreds more went missing following the operation. A country-wide ceasefire came into effect on 12 October, one day after the offensive ended, and was soon followed by negotiations which produced the Dayton Agreement, ending the Bosnian War.

== Background ==
As the Yugoslav People's Army (Jugoslovenska narodna armija – JNA) withdrew from Croatia following the acceptance and start of implementation of the Vance plan, its 55,000 officers and soldiers born in Bosnia and Herzegovina were transferred to a new Bosnian Serb army, which was later renamed the Army of Republika Srpska (Vojska Republike Srpske – VRS). This re-organisation followed the declaration of the Serbian Republic of Bosnia and Herzegovina on 9 January 1992, ahead of the referendum on the independence of Bosnia and Herzegovina that took place between 29 February and 1 March 1992. This declaration would later be cited by the Bosnian Serbs as a pretext for the Bosnian War. Bosnian Serbs began fortifying the capital, Sarajevo, and other areas on 1 March 1992. On the following day, the first fatalities of the war were recorded in Sarajevo and Doboj. In the final days of March, Bosnian Serb forces bombarded Bosanski Brod with artillery, resulting in a cross-border operation by the Croatian Army (Hrvatska vojska – HV) 108th Brigade. On 4 April 1992, JNA artillery began shelling Sarajevo. There were other examples of the JNA directly supported the VRS, such as during the capture of Zvornik in early April 1992, when the JNA provided artillery support from Serbia, firing across the Drina River. At the same time, the JNA attempted to defuse the situation and arrange negotiations elsewhere in the country.

The JNA and the VRS in Bosnia and Herzegovina faced the Army of the Republic of Bosnia and Herzegovina (Armija Republike Bosne i Hercegovine – ARBiH) and the Croatian Defence Council (Hrvatsko vijeće obrane – HVO), reporting to the Bosniak-dominated central government and the Bosnian Croat leadership respectively, as well as the HV, which occasionally supported HVO operations. In late April 1992, the VRS was able to deploy 200,000 troops, hundreds of tanks, armoured personnel carriers (APCs) and artillery pieces. The HVO and the Croatian Defence Forces (Hrvatske obrambene snage – HOS) could field approximately 25,000 soldiers and a handful of heavy weapons, while the ARBiH was largely unprepared with nearly 100,000 troops, small arms for less than a half of their number and virtually no heavy weapons. Arming of the various forces was hampered by a United Nations (UN) arms embargo that had been introduced in September 1991. By mid-May 1992, when those JNA units which had not been transferred to the VRS withdrew from Bosnia and Herzegovina to the newly declared Federal Republic of Yugoslavia, the VRS controlled approximately 60 percent of Bosnia and Herzegovina. The extent of VRS control was extended to about 70 percent of the country by the end of 1992.

== Prelude ==
By 1995, the ARBiH and the HVO had developed into better-organised forces employing comparably large numbers of artillery pieces and good defensive fortifications. The VRS was not capable of penetrating their defences even where its forces employed sound military tactics, for instance in the Battle of Orašje in May and June 1995. After recapture of the bulk of the Republic of Serb Krajina (the Croatian Serb-controlled areas of Croatia) in Operation Storm in August 1995, the HV shifted its focus to western Bosnia and Herzegovina. The shift was motivated by a desire to create a security zone along the Croatian border, establish Croatia as a regional power and gain favours with the West by forcing an end to the Bosnian War. The government of Bosnia and Herzegovina welcomed the move as it contributed to their goal of gaining control over western Bosnia and the city of Banja Luka—the largest city in the Bosnian Serb-held territory.

In the final days of August 1995, NATO launched Operation Deliberate Force—an air campaign targeting the VRS. This campaign was launched in response to the second Markale massacre of 28 August, which came on the heels of the Srebrenica massacre. Airstrikes began on 30 August, initially targeting VRS air defences, and striking targets near Sarajevo. The campaign was briefly suspended on 1 September and its scope was expanded to target artillery and storage facilities around the city. The bombing resumed on 5 September, and its scope extended to VRS air defences near Banja Luka by 9 September as NATO had nearly exhausted its list of targets near Sarajevo. On 13 September, the Bosnian Serbs accepted NATO's demand for the establishment of an exclusion zone around Sarajevo and the campaign ceased.

Following a relative lull in fighting in western Bosnia, the HV, HVO and ARBiH renewed their joint offensive against the VRS in the region. The HV and HVO component of the offensive, codenamed Operation Maestral 2, was launched on 8 September with the aim of capturing the towns of Jajce, Šipovo and Drvar. The ARBiH 7th Corps advanced on the right flank of the HV and the HVO towards Donji Vakuf. As Operation Maestral 2 neared its objectives, the ARBiH 5th Corps launched Operation Sana in the Bihać area, aimed at pushing the VRS back to the Sana River to the east. The ARBiH achieved significant territorial gains, advancing 70 kilometres (43 miles) to capture the town of Ključ, and approaching Sanski Most and Novi Grad by 18–19 September—before being halted by significant VRS reinforcements. A VRS counteroffensive, launched on the night of 23/24 September from Novi Grad, Sanski Most and Mrkonjić Grad gradually pushed the 5th Corps back towards Bosanska Krupa and Ključ, despite gradual arrival of reinforcements dispatched by the ARBiH 7th Corps. The VRS had approached within 1,000 metres (3,300 feet) of Ključ by 6 October, and ARBiH control of the town was under threat. In response, the ARBiH requested HV and HVO assistance.

== Order of battle ==
The HV and the HVO forces earmarked for the offensive comprised 11,000–12,000 troops, organised into two groups, under the overall command of HV Major General Ante Gotovina. The primary group consisted of the 4th Guards and the 7th Guards Brigades, the 1st Croatian Guards Brigade (1. hrvatski gardijski zdrug – 1st HGZ) of the HV, while the second group was spearheaded by the 1st, 2nd and 3rd Guards Brigades of the HVO, and included the 126th Home Guard Regiment of the HV.

The VRS units facing the combined HV/HVO force were elements of Operational Group-2 and the 30th Division, under the command of Colonel Milenko Lazić. They were deployed around Mrkonjić Grad, and comprised the 7th Motorised, 3rd Serbian and 11th Mrkonjić Light Infantry brigades. The three brigades, numbering approximately 5,500 troops, were tasked to cover the rear of the VRS force counterattacking the ARBiH force in Ključ.

HV and HVO order of battle.
Group	Unit	Notes
Primary	4th Guards Brigade	HV units
Primary	7th Guards Brigade	HV units
Primary	1st Croatian Guards Brigade	HV units
Secondary	1st Guards Brigade	HVO units
Secondary	2nd Guards Brigade	HVO units
Secondary	3rd Guards Brigade	HVO units
Secondary	60th Guards Airborne Battalion	HVO units
Secondary	22nd Sabotage Detachment	HVO units
Secondary	Special police of the Ministry of Interior of Herzeg-Bosnia	HVO units
Secondary	126th Home Guard Regiment	HV units
Secondary	General Staff Reconnaissance Sabotage Company	HV units

VRS order of battle
Area	Unit	Notes
Mrkonjić Grad	7th Kupres-Šipovo Motorised Brigade	Southeast of Mrkonjić Grad
Mrkonjić Grad	3rd Serbian Brigade	Southwest of Mrkonjić Grad
Mrkonjić Grad	11th Mrkonjić Light Infantry Brigade	West of Mrkonjić Grad

== Timeline ==
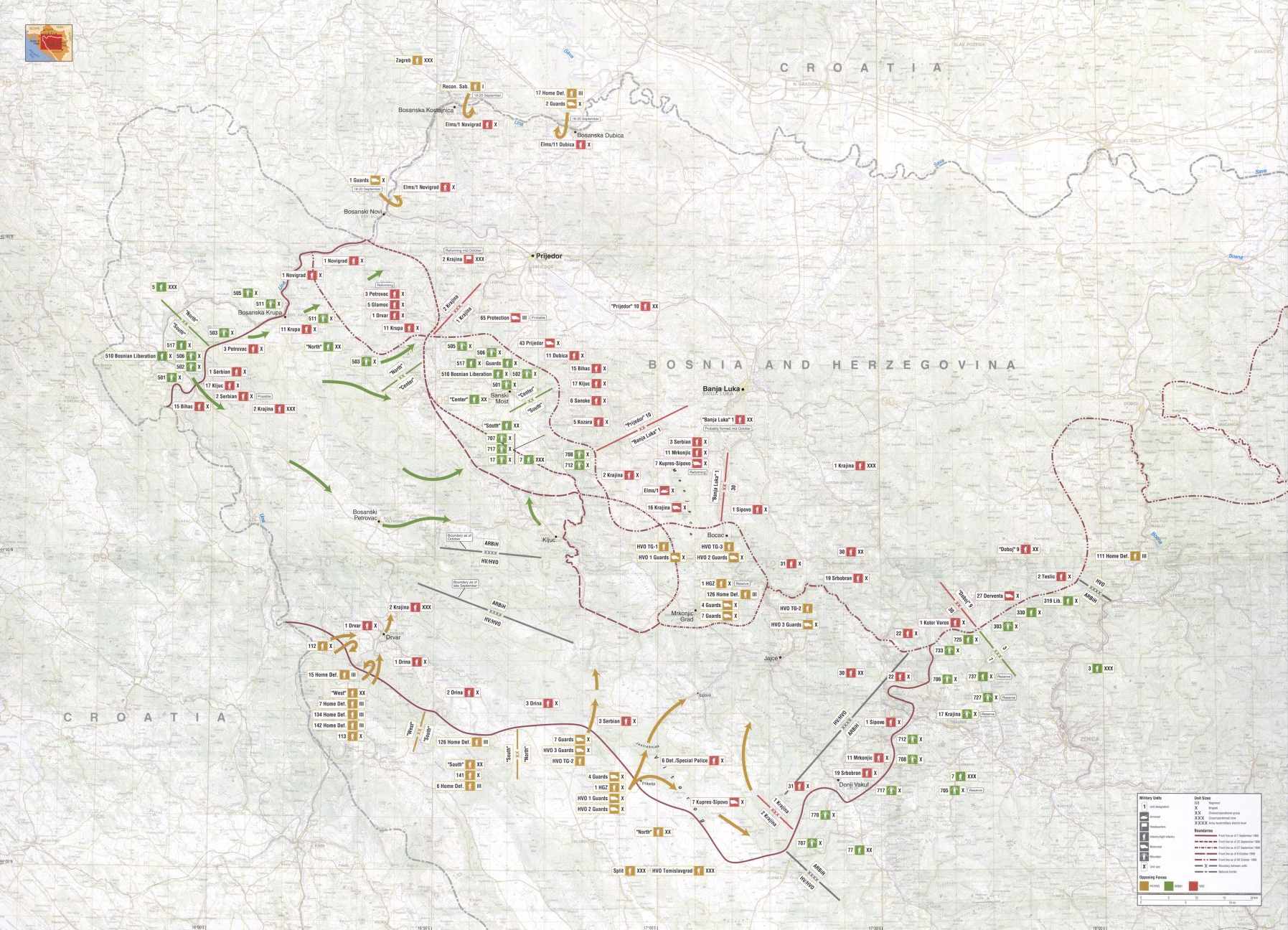
Map of battles in western Bosnia in September–October 1995; Operation Southern Move is depicted in the centre of the map

Operation Southern Move was to be carried out in two stages. The first stage involved the capture of Mrkonjić Grad and the surrounding Podrašnica Valley. In the second phase of the operation, the force would seize the last significant source of electricity in the VRS-controlled part of western Bosnia and Herzegovina—the Bočac Hydroelectric Power Station. The whole operation was planned to take four days, immediately preceding a country-wide ceasefire scheduled to take effect on the morning of 12 October 1995. According to Brigadier Ante Kotromanović, then commander of the 126th Home Guard Regiment, the offensive was approved by the United States, and U.S. warplanes attacked VRS positions near Banja Luka in preparation of the offensive.

=== Phase one: 8–9 October ===
The offensive began on 8 October with an attack launched by the HV 126th Home Guard Regiment and the HVO 1st Guards Brigade from a starting line 15 to 20 kilometres (9.3 to 12.4 miles) west of Mrkonjić Grad, against positions held by the 11th Mrkonjić Light Infantry Brigade. This effort was intended as a diversion aimed at misleading the VRS defences regarding the main axis of the offensive. It was hampered by poor weather which prevented the effective use of artillery fire.

The main HV force committed to the offensive, comprising the 4th Guards and the 7th Guards brigades and the 1st HGZ, began their advance on 9 October. Poor weather and heavy fog forced the HV to postpone the attack from 6:00 until 8:50. The advance was supported by strong artillery fire support and two Mil Mi-24s of the Croatian Air Force. The HV 7th Guards Brigade struggled to advance against the VRS positions southeast of Mrkonjić Grad around the villages of Liskovica, Bjelajci and Šehovci, manned by the 7th Motorised Brigade. The 4th Guards Brigade and the 1st HGZ faced the defences southwest of the town, manned by the 3rd Serbian Brigade. By the end of the day, the HV had advanced by about 5 kilometres (3.1 miles) partially enveloping Mrkonjić Grad. The town itself was hit by about 200 artillery shells fired by the HV and HVO.

=== Phase two: 10–11 October ===
On 10 October, the 4th Guards Brigade broke through and outflanked the 7th Motorised Brigade positions, forcing the VRS to withdraw from Mrkonjić Grad. The move also placed the Podrašnica Valley and Čađavica junction under HV control, completing the objectives of the first stage of the operation. The HVO 2nd Guards Brigade was deployed on the right flank of the 7th Guards Brigade and the two units advanced north towards Bočac. At the same time, the 4th Guards Brigade advanced onto Manjača mountain.

The HV units were replaced by HVO elements on 11 October. The HVO 1st Guards and 2nd Guards brigades took over the northward advance from the HV 4th Guards and 7th Guards brigades, while the HVO 3rd Guards Brigade relieved the 1st HGZ and the 126th Home Guard Regiment. The VRS defence was disorganised, and they were gradually pushed north, while maintaining effective artillery fire support for their retreating troops. By the end of the day, the HVO had captured the Bočac Hydroelectric Power Station. The final objective was achieved when the force reached a line 25 kilometres (16 miles) south of Banja Luka. The advance reportedly came within 14 kilometres (9 miles) of Banja Luka, whose electrical power supply was interrupted, and where a curfew was imposed in response to the deteriorating situation. Operation Southern Move ended on the night of 11/12 October.

== Aftermath ==
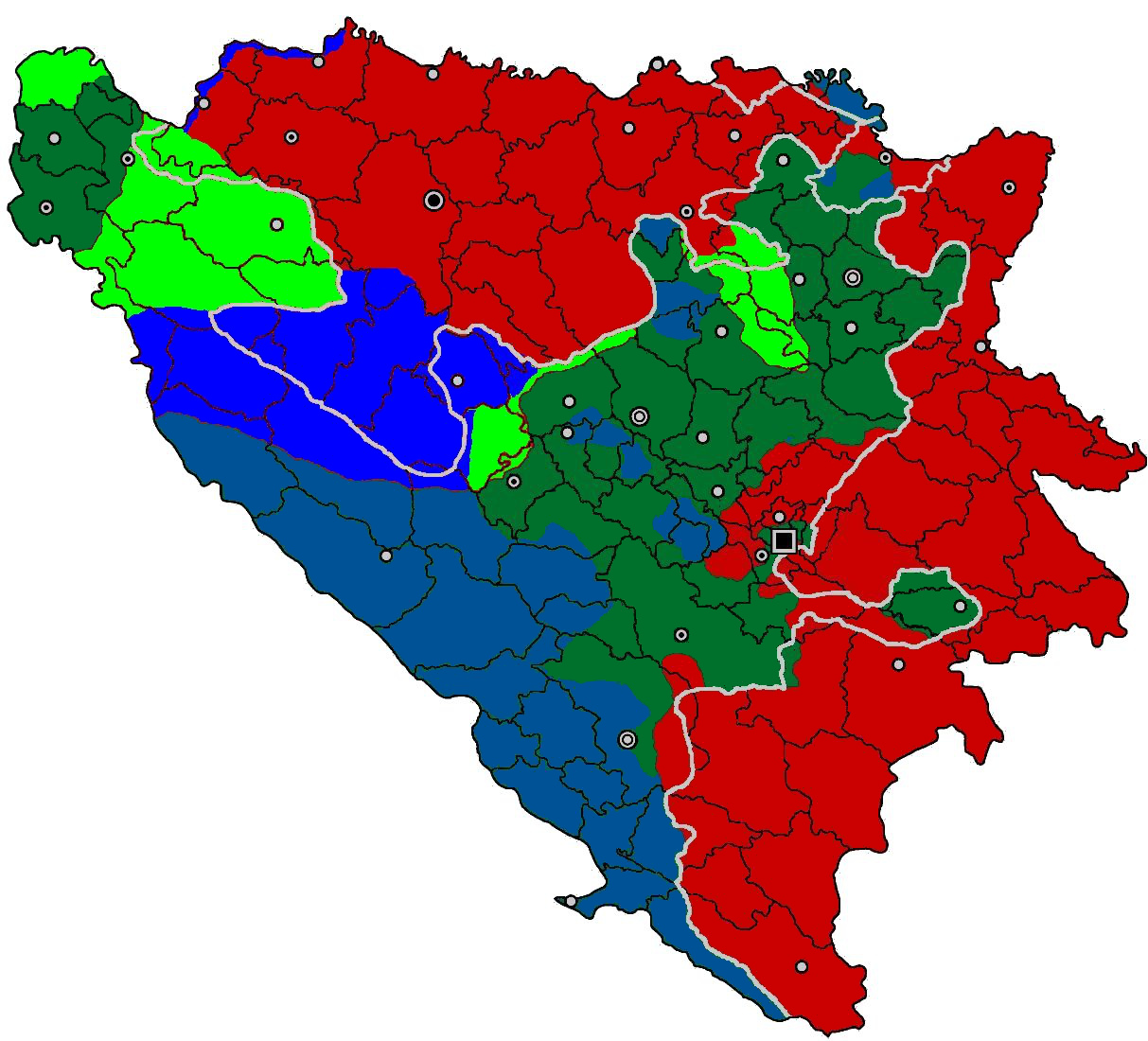
Areas captured in September–October 1995 by HV and HVO, and by ARBiH

The offensive captured an area 40 kilometres (25 miles) wide and 20 kilometres (12 miles) deep. The defeat of the VRS also made it clear to the Bosnian Serb leadership that they had to commit to ending the war through negotiations or risk the capture of Banja Luka. In addition, the offensive proved decisive in halting the VRS counteroffensive against the ARBiH near Ključ and Bosanska Krupa, and allowing the ARBiH to mount a successful advance against the VRS 1st Krajina Corps defending Sanski Most. Finally, the outcome of the battle brought the VRS to a position where it was forced to choose between defending Prijedor, Banja Luka or the Doboj–Brčko route. This route had been vital for the resupply of both Banja Luka and Doboj since the VRS secured it in Operation Corridor 92 three years earlier. According to a Central Intelligence Agency analysis, the ground offensives of the HV, HVO and ARBiH in western Bosnia and Herzegovina, including Operation Southern Move, were a more significant contributor to bringing the Bosnian Serbs to the negotiation table than NATO airstrikes. A country-wide ceasefire went into effect on 12 October, followed by negotiations which produced the Dayton Agreement on 21 November and ended the Bosnian War.

The offensive displaced 10,000 Serb refugees from Mrkonjić Grad, adding to a growing humanitarian crisis as another 30,000 Serbs fled Sanski Most before the ARBiH captured it in the final days of Operation Sana. Approximately 6,000 non-Serbs were forced to flee their homes in Prijedor and Novi Grad by Bosnian Serb forces. According to Bosnian Serb sources, 480 Serbs died or went missing in the fighting in the area of Mrkonjić Grad. The figure includes 181 bodies recovered in a mass grave at the town's Serbian Orthodox cemetery. According to the Republika Srpska police who investigated the scene and interviewed witnesses, most of the dead were VRS prisoners of war or civilians who were killed by the 4th Guards Brigade to avenge the death of Colonel Andrija Matijaš, the brigade's deputy commander. The results of the investigation were forwarded to the International Criminal Tribunal for the former Yugoslavia (ICTY), but the ICTY did not pursue the matter. As of December 2013, an investigation by the Bosnia and Herzegovina authorities against 27 high-ranking HV and HVO officers and Croatian officials is ongoing. In 2013, an officer and two soldiers of the 7th Guards Brigade charged with killing four Serb civilians near Mrkonjić Grad were acquitted, pending appeal.
