= Operation Sword–1 =

1995 operation of the Bosnian War

- Part of the Intra-Bosnian Muslim War
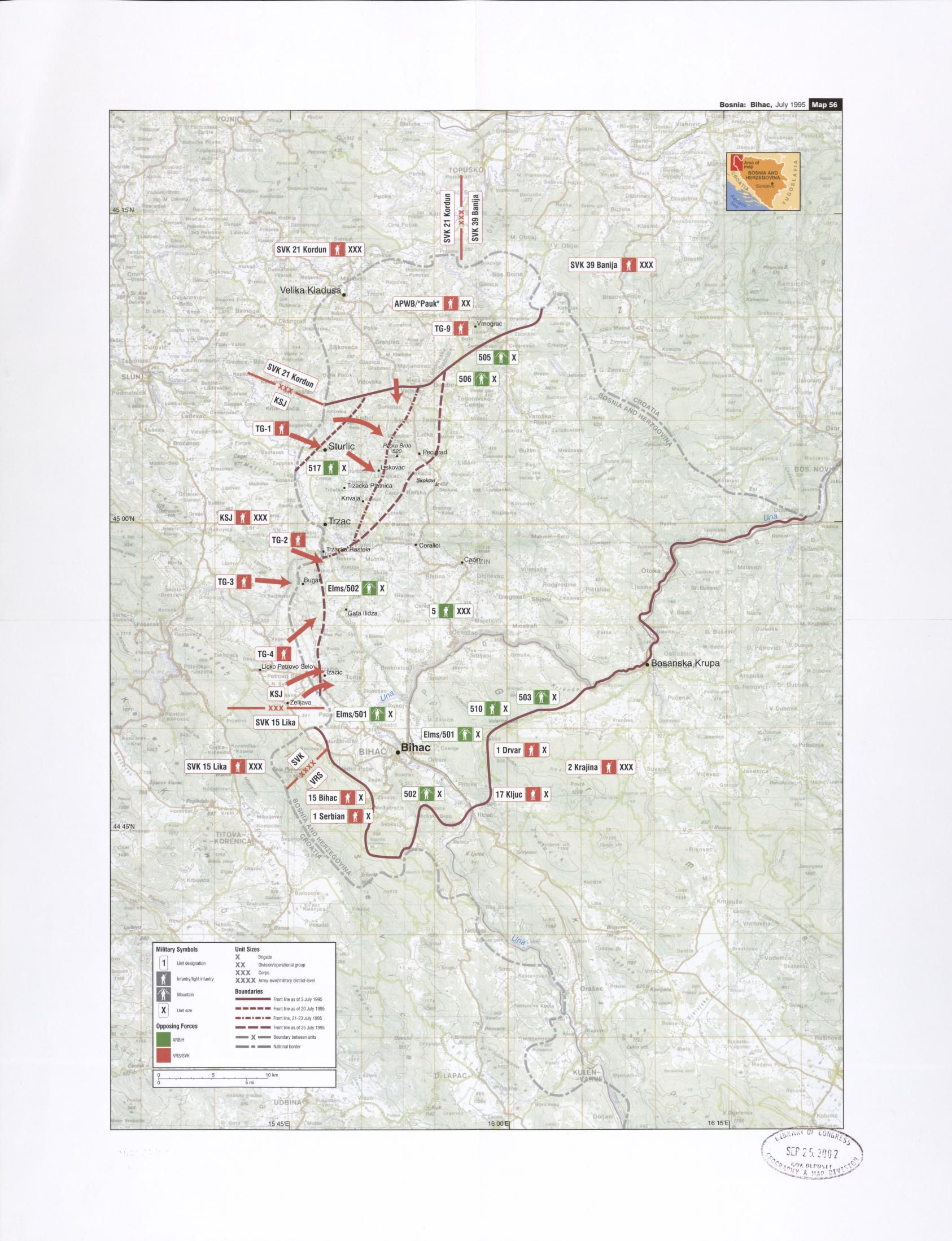
- SVK and NOZB July 1995 offensive on Cazin
Date	19 – 25 July 1995
Location	Šturlić, Pećigrad, Tržac, Vikići, Autonomous Province of Western Bosnia 45°03′50″N 15°46′41″E
Result	SVK and NOZB victory: APZB becomes twice as large and becomes a republic

Belligerents
Autonomous Province of Western Bosnia; Republic of Serbian Krajina	Republic of Bosnia and Herzegovina; Croatian Republic of Herzeg-Bosnia

Commanders and leaders
Fikret Abdić; Milorad Stupar	(Bosnia and Herzegovina) Atif Dudaković (Bosnia and Herzegovina) Izet Nanić (Bosnia and Herzegovina) Nijaz Begić †

Units involved
National Defence of the APZB (NOZB); 1st NOZB Brigade; 2nd NOZB Brigade; 3rd NOZB Brigade; Special Unit Golubovi; Army of Serbian Krajina; 15th Lika Corps; 21st Kordun Corps; Special Forces Corps	Army of the Republic of Bosnia and Herzegovina; 5th Corps; 505th Bužim Brigade; 506th Brigade; 502nd Bihać Brigade; 517th Brigade; 501st Brigade; Croatian Defence Council

Casualties and losses
Unknown	68 killed, 200 wounded

The Operation Sword–1 was first phase of a bigger operation called "Sword 95" during the 1995 Bosnian War and Inter-Bosnian Muslim War. The goal of Sword–1 was to make APZB double in size and to return its largest village Šturlić. And after that to be declared a republic. The goal of Sword–2 was to occupy Cazin because it was in the middle of the Bihać enclave, and that would put a lot of pressure on 5th Corps. But due to operation Storm, this phase did not start.

== Background ==
After Operation Spider, the NOZB, with the help of Serbian volunteers, defeated the ARBiH in two offensives, Mala Kladuša offensive and attack on Vrnograč. Mrksić's campaign plan to defeat the 5th Corps—"Operation Sword 95"—focused on the seizure of Cazin, and for good reasons. Cazin sat at the centre of the Bihać enclave (in fact, the area was often called "Cazinska Krajina"), and all lines of communication ran through it. Supplies to support the 5th Corps were flown into the town's Coralici airfield in light transports and helicopters, and makeshift ammunition production facilities there helped keep the 5th Corps going. Cazin's loss would effectively bisect the Bihać pocket, fragmenting 5th Corps and exposing it to the prospect of destruction.

== Battle ==
The SVK and NOZB planned to start the operation on 15 July. The start was delayed four days, however, by problems in regrouping units, mobilizing additional SVK and Krajina Serb MUP personnel to replace the missing VRS troops, and an ARBiH spoiling attack.

On 17 July, two LUNA-M (FROG-7) surface-to-surface rockets landed near the border town of Izačić, a typical start to a Serb offensive. Two days later, General Stupar and General Novaković's troops launched their attack at 03:00, pushing across the frontier from the west on four axes and south from Velika Kladusa. OG "Pauk" and Tactical Group-1 attacked toward Johovica and Šturlić, Tactical Group-2 assaulted the Tržačka Raštela sector, Tactical Group-3 hit the Bugar area, and Tactical Group-4 struck Zeljava-Izačić. TG-2, 3, and 4 ran into stiff resistance from a battalion of the crack 502nd Mountain Brigade, and SVK troops here managed to advance only a kilometre or two. They also failed to take the important border village of Tržačka Raštela on the main road to Cazin.

The SVK offensive was weakened by morale problems in the RSK Special Police Brigade—apparently part of TG-2 which refused to attack. OG "Pauk" and TG-1, however, smashed the weak 517th Light Brigade around Šturlić, quickly driving ARBiH troops back more than 2 kilometres by 20 July. To meet this development, 5th Corps staff quickly alerted the 502nd Brigade to rush the rest of its available troops from the Bihać city area to the site of the breakthrough.

Barely checked by the arrival of the Bosnian reserves, the SVK advance continued to the east of Šturlić, and by 21 July the KSJ penetration had extended to 7 kilometres. The SVK and NOZB troops pushed on, advancing further east toward the town of Pećigrad, a key choke-point on the Velika Kladuša-Cazin road. OG "Pauk" now launched a major thrust toward Pećigrad, coming directly from the north. There were also skirmishes in the Vrnograč-Pećgrad region between the NOZB and the 505th and 506th with a solid advance of the NOZB.

On 25 July, Dudakovic's defensive situation grew critical. He was still being pounded by TG-1 and OG "Pauk" when TG-3 and TG-4 launched a new attack toward Bugar and Izačić, breaking through the 502nd Mountain Brigade before being contained in front of Izačić and Gata Ilidza. OG "Pauk" and TG-1's continuing drive had brought the SVK another 2 kilometres into the pocket since 23 July, and it had seized key positions at Pecka Brda, Liskovac, and Krivaja. The key passes at Pećigrad and Skokovi were seriously threatened as the SVK offensive approached its apex. Serb troops were within 5 kilometres of Coralici airfield and Cazin, and, on 26 July, Abdić confidently announced the transformation of the Autonomous Province of Western Bosnia into the Republic of Western Bosnia. General Dudaković would later describe this SVK offensive as his most difficult experience of the war.

== Aftermath ==
After the successful 1st phase, SVK and NOZB were preparing for the 2nd phase, in which they were supposed to capture Cazin, But due to the great danger on the horizon from the Croats, SVK withdrawn from Republic of Western Bosnia in August. Croats begin Operation Storm, in which they occupy almost the entire Republic of Serbian Krajina. The Republic of Western Bosnia was left fighting alone until the fall of Velika Kladuša on 7th August.
