= Siege of Bihać (1992–1995) =

Three-year-long siege of the northwestern Bosnian town of Bihać during the Bosnian War

Coordinates: 44°49′N 15°52′E

- Part of the Bosnian War, Croatian War of Independence and the Inter-Bosnian Muslim War
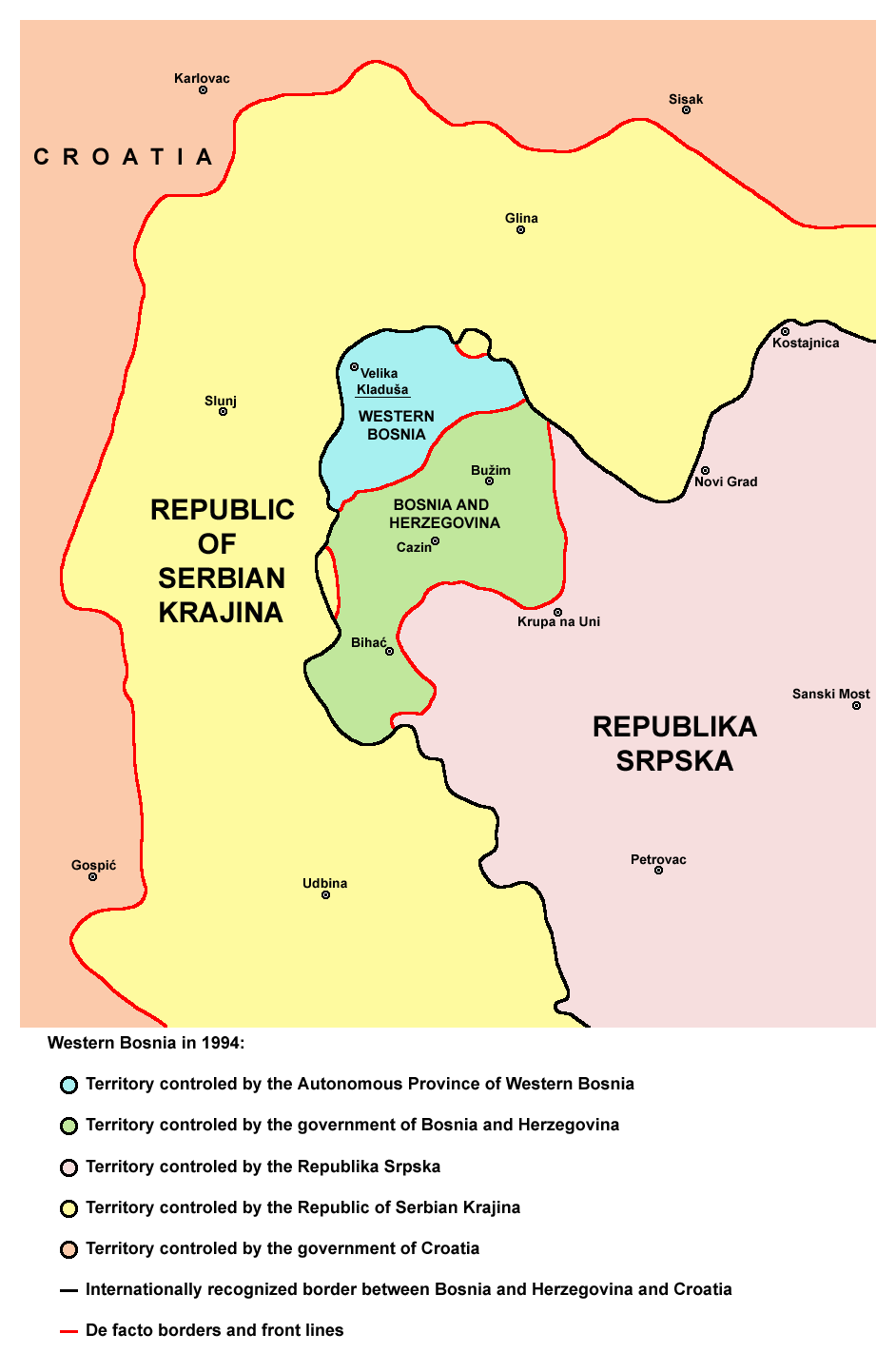
- Map of the Bihać enclave (under the control of the Bosnian-Herzegovinian government), surrounded by the Republic of Serbian Krajina (in the northwest), the Autonomous Province of Western Bosnia (to the north) and the Republika Srpska (to the southeast)
Date	12 June 1992 – 4–5 August 1995
Location	Bihać, Bosnia and Herzegovina
Result	ARBiH and Croatian Army victory: Siege lifted; Autonomous Province of Western Bosnia abolished

Belligerents
Bosnia and Herzegovina; Croatia	Republika Srpska; Republic of Serbian Krajina; Autonomous Province of Western Bosnia

Commanders and leaders
(Bosnia and Herzegovina) Atif Dudaković; (Bosnia and Herzegovina) Izet Nanić †; (Bosnia and Herzegovina) Adil Bešić †; (Bosnia and Herzegovina) Jasmin Kulenović †; (Bosnia and Herzegovina) Irfan Ljubijankić †; (Bosnia and Herzegovina) Tomislav Dretar; (Croatian Republic of Herzeg-Bosnia) Vlado Šantić †; (Croatia) Zvonimir Červenko; (Croatia) Ante Gotovina	(Republika Srpska) Ratko Mladić; (Republika Srpska) Momir Talić; Milan Martić; Mile Novaković; Fikret Abdić; Zlatko Jušić; Hasib Hodžić

Units involved
Bosnian Army; 5th Corps; Croatian Army	Army of Republika Srpska; Army of Serbian Krajina; National Defence of the APZB

Strength
ARBiH: 10,000–20,000 soldiers HV: 10,000 soldiers	VRS: 10,000 soldiers SVK: 3,000–5,000 soldiers NOZB: 4,000–5,000 soldiers

Casualties and losses
c. 3,000 killed	1,500–1,700 killed
- Total: 4,856 killed or missing civilians

The siege of Bihać was a three-year-long siege of the northwestern Bosnian town of Bihać by the Army of the Republika Srpska, the Army of the Republic of Serbian Krajina and Bosnian Muslim dissenters led by Fikret Abdić during the 1992–1995 Bosnian War. The siege lasted for three years, from June 1992 until 4–5 August 1995, when Operation Storm ended it after the Croatian Army (HV) overran the rebel Serbs in Croatia and northwest of the besieged town.

The Research and Documentation Center in Sarajevo established that the communities that were under siege – Bihać, Bosanska Krupa, Cazin and Velika Kladuša – had 4,856 killed or missing persons from 1991 to 1995.

== Timeline ==
=== 1992 ===
After the secessionist Serb Republic of Serbian Krajina was proclaimed in 1991 on the west, the inhabitants of Bihać were prevented from crossing into that territory. Additionally, after Bosnian Serbs proclaimed the Republika Srpska in 1992 to the east, the communities of Bihać, Bosanska Krupa, Cazin, and Velika Kladuša found themselves surrounded on both sides. The two Serbian armies cooperated to capture the Bosniak pocket in the middle of them. It was blockaded and bombarded by the Serbian forces starting on 12 June 1992. Consequently, the residents of Bihać were forced to live in shelters without electricity or a water supply, receiving only limited food relief. Famine would occasionally break out. The Bihać region declared a state of emergency and its defence was organized within the Army of the Republic of Bosnia and Herzegovina (ARBiH), forming the 5th Corps as the main military formation responsible for the area. Alongside ARBiH units, Croat formations also participated in the defense of the Bihać pocket. One of their leaders was Tomislav Dretar, a pre-war sociologist and poet who became commander of the local HVO detachment in Bihać.

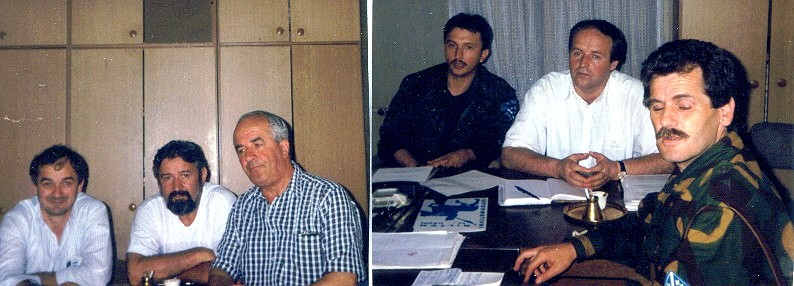
War presidency of the Bihać area during one meeting in Cazin (July 1992)

An artillery shell fired from Serb positions in the hill hit the town centre on 11 August 1992, next to a building converted into a shelter for Bosniak women and children. It killed five people, including three children, and wounded 24. Eight people needed amputations. The director of the town's hospital said that "all of the casualties were big operations". The inhabitants of Bihać, armed with little except old rifles, had no means of retaliating. Instead, as on every day since 12 June, when the Army of the Republika Srpska first began to bombard Bihać, people simply did their best to carry away the wounded and clear up the wreckage. A secretary said it "took hours to wash away the blood". Almost every day, the Serbs fired more shells, some in the morning, some in the afternoon, and some at night. On one day in August, shelling lasted from 6.40 pm until well after midnight.

The region had a mainly Bosniak population and, since the outbreak of armed conflict, had received some 35,000 displaced persons, most of them coming from Serb-controlled areas around Banja Luka and Sanski Most in the summer of 1992. In return, most of the Serbs, some 12,000 before the war, left Bihać for Banja Luka simultaneously.

=== 1993 ===
The designation of Srebrenica as a safe area was extended on 6 May 1993 to include five other Bosnian towns: Sarajevo, Tuzla, Žepa, Goražde and Bihać. The Bosnian President, Alija Izetbegović, dismissed the concept. He said the havens would become death traps, where refugees, thinking they were safe, would instead become easy targets for Bosnian Serb forces.

Bihać had few food convoys throughout the three years, with only the occasional airlift reaching the town's inhabitants. The wreckage of the bombing lay all around. Sandbags were piled high against houses, and bunkers were dotted on street corners. Almost half the population was drafted into the Army to defend the area. Cars almost disappeared from the streets of what was once a relatively prosperous community. There was nowhere to go and little fuel. The post office was piled high with sandbags. Almost every telephone line had been cut since 1991. The deployment of UN troops in the area did not help: Serbian forces inside the UN-protected zone in Croatia hijacked an aid convoy heading for Bihać in April 1993. UN refugee officials stood by helplessly as the Serbs made off with 19 tons of food, mainly ready-to-eat meals, and distributed the food to Croatian Serb civilians. The journalist Marcus Tanner cynically commented how the Serbs from the 'UN protected' Krajina were shelling Bihać, a 'UN safe area'.

The Bihać area, which contained 170,000 people, had been denied support from UN aid convoys since May 1993. By 1993, the enclave hosted 61,000 displaced or refugees from other parts of Bosnia, amounting to 27 percent of its entire population. The entire Bihać area had only one hospital that had exhausted the last of its food and medical reserves by December 1994, so that the feeding of the sick and wounded, more than 900 patients, was limited to one meal per day. Treatment was given only to the most desperate cases, whereas operations were being performed under local anesthesia. In this situation, without the necessary food and medicines, infectious diseases were spreading- tuberculosis, intestinal diseases, hepatitis, and vitamin A deficiency. The hospital was no longer in a position to help the inhabitants of the area.

The enclave was additionally weakened when rebel Bosniak forces led by Fikret Abdić joined the Serbs in the fighting and created the Autonomous Province of Western Bosnia in the north.

=== 1994 ===
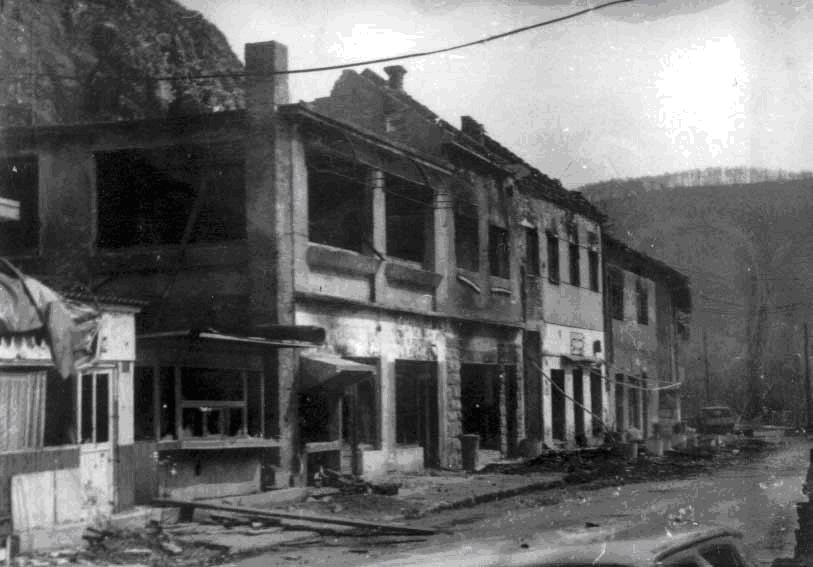
Bosanska Krupa after the war

On June 2, 1994, the 5th Corps, under the command of Atif Dudaković, overran and seized the territory of Western Bosnia and Fikret Abdić fled to Zagreb for safety. The battle was a huge success for the ARBiH, which was able to rout Abdić's forces and manage to push the Serb forces from Bihać and abolish Western Bosnia temporarily.

On November 4, 1994, the Autonomous Province of Western Bosnia was re-established after a Serb counterattack against the Bosnian forces.

By 27 November 1994, advancing Serb forces had taken around a third of the zone. Fighting raged less than 500 yards from the Bihać hospital and moved closer to the headquarters of the Bosnian Fifth Corps. However, the UN Security Council had failed to reach an agreement on a draft statement that would condemn the Serbs' shelling of and entry into Bihać and call for their withdrawal. The US plan to relieve the city was rejected by France and Britain. Bosnian-Serb forces first set a deadline of 19.00 GMT on 26 November for the town's defenders to surrender. They later amended this with a new offer for Bosnian-Muslim troops to surrender to Fikret Abdić's forces. But the mayor of Bihać, Hamdija Kabiljagić, rejected the surrender, saying "it would be the signal for mass slaughter by the Serbs". Bihać's citizens then proceeded to blockade the streets with trees and burned out cars.

Michael Williams, a spokesman for the United Nations peacekeeping force, said that the village of Vedro Polje west of Bihać had fallen to a Croatian Serb unit in late November 1994. Williams added that heavy tank and artillery fire against the town of Velika Kladuša in the north of the Bihać enclave was coming from the Croatian Serbs. Moreover, Western military analysts said that among the impressive array of Bosnian-Serb surface-to-air missile systems that surrounded the Bihać pocket on Croatian territory, there was a modernized SAM-2 system whose degree of sophistication suggested that it was probably brought there recently from Belgrade.

Since Operation Deny Flight did not allow fighter jets to be used in Bosnia, the Army of the Republika Srpska took advantage of the ban by outsourcing air strikes to the Army of Srpska Krajina: they launched air strikes with aircraft based at a former Yugoslav People's Army (JNA) military airport in Udbina, south of Bihać, located in Croatian territory that was at the time controlled by the Republic of Serbian Krajina. The Serb aircraft dropped napalm and cluster bombs. Although most of the ordnance came from old, unreliable stocks and failed to explode, the attacks were a clear violation of the no-fly zone. NATO immediately looked for ways to respond, but its forces were not permitted to carry out operations in Croatian airspace, and due to Bihać's proximity to the border, Serb aircraft could attack into Bosnia, then cross back into Croatia before being intercepted. As such, NATO was powerless to stop the incursions. In recognition of the situation, the UNSC passed Resolution 958, which allowed NATO aircraft to operate in Croatia. Under the cool leadership of the UNHCR Director of Logistics Operations, Peter Walsh, the refugee agency breached the blockade in December 1994 and got 100 tonnes of valuable food aid into the pocket. This was a difficult task hampered by persistent small arms and artillery fire, as well as unnecessary freedom of movement violations. The aid was delivered to Cazin for distribution throughout the region.

The United Nations Security Council Resolution 959 "expressed concern about the escalation in recent fighting in the Bihać pocket and the flow of refugees and displaced persons resulting from it" and condemned the "violation of the international border between the Republic of Croatia and the Republic of Bosnia and Herzegovina and demands that all parties and others concerned, and in particular the so-called Krajina Serb forces, fully respect the border and refrain from hostile acts across it".

=== 1995 ===
In March 1995, tensions between Croat and Bosniak forces briefly escalated after the abduction of HVO Major General Vlado Šantić by members of the 502nd Brigade of the ARBiH in Bihać. Šantić disappeared on 8 March 1995 following the incident, which was investigated by a joint Croat–Bosniak commission. Although several suspects were arrested, the Bosnian Army described the event as a possible settling of personal or criminal scores. The incident did not escalate further, and cooperation between Croat and Bosniak forces in the enclave continued to improve later in the year.

The enclave came under heavy tank and mortar fire again on 23 July 1995 in what UN officials described as "the most serious fighting in Bosnia in months". Thousands of rebel troops, backed by 100 tanks, attacked the Bosniak forces there. The United Nations General Assembly also addressed the issue:

"Military exercise activities intensified after the Bosnian Army 5th Corps engaged Serbian troops in western Bosnia [Bihać region]. At the same time, the "Army of the Republic of Serbian Krajina" started with large-scale preparations for offensive actions in the western Bosnia theatre of operations.... In September 1994, 700 to 800 volunteers from Serbia were trained in the Slunj area for combat action in western Bosnia."

— United Nations General Assembly on the situation in the occupied territories of Croatia

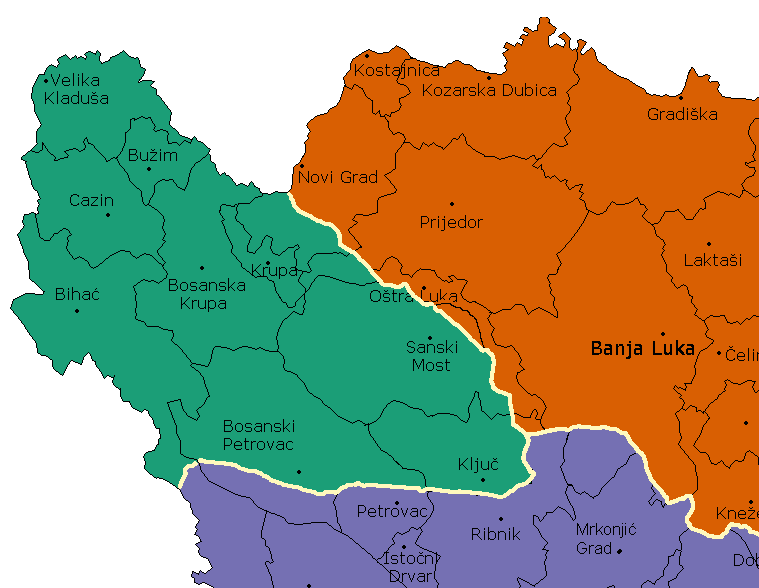
ARBiH in 1995

In 1995, ARBiH launched a series of major offensives, including Operation Sana, Operation Dawn and Operation Triangle aimed at breaking the long-standing siege of the Bihać pocket. These operations successfully pushed back VRS and SVK forces, liberated key territories in northwestern Bosnia, and linked the enclave with other government-held areas, significantly weakening the Serb hold in Krajina and shifting the momentum of the war.

== UNPROFOR in Bihać ==
On 14 September 1992, UNPROFOR was given a mandate by the United Nations Security Council to protect humanitarian relief convoys as requested by the United Nations High Commissioner for Refugees (UNHCR) and provide ground transportation for difficult routes (UNPROFOR phase 2, resolution 743). An "escort battalion" was then formed by France, and sent in October and November 1992, with 1350 soldiers and 115 light armored vehicles.

The main base was in Ćoralići (1 infantry coy, 1 cavalry coy with 18 ERC-90 Sagaie, 1 engineer Coy, battalion HQ), logistic base in Velika-Kladusa (1 infantry coy, 1 logistic and support coy) and a forward operating base in Bihać (1 infantry coy).

- 1st mandate: October 1992 – May 1993 – 126th Infantry Regiment, 1st Marine Infantry Regiment – CO: Colonel Bresse
- 2nd mandate: May 1993 – October 1993 – 1st Parachute Hussar Regiment
- 3rd mandate: October 1993 – May 1994 – formed from the 99e RI, 1st Spahi Regiment; 3 casualties (fatal).
- 4th mandate: May 1994 – October 1994 – formed from the 2nd Armored Division (5e RI, 2 inf coy, 1 HQ & Support coy + RMT elements, 4th RD, 1 armored coy, engineer coy, 24e RI, 1 infantry coy). CO: Colonel Fredéric Decquen; No casualties.

The French left in October and November 1994 and were replaced by a battalion from Bangladesh.

== End of siege ==
After the fall of the Srebrenica and Žepa enclaves in eastern Bosnia in July 1995, Croatia started massing soldiers near Serb positions outside the enclave as Serb forces with tanks and artillery bombarded the Bosnian government's lines. The goal was to prevent the fall of the Bihać enclave. Likewise, the Croatian and Bosnian leaderships signed a mutual defence treaty — the Split Agreement.

The siege ended with Operation Storm on 4–5 August 1995 conjoined with Bosnian forces under General Atif Dudaković. Dudaković said: "We needed Operation Storm as much as Croatia did". After the end of siege, food supplies and medical aid started arriving in the area from Bosnia and Croatia, which normalized the lives of the people living there.

The Republic of Western Bosnia was wiped out completely during the joint Croatian-Bosnian government army action on 7 August 1995. A month later, the Bosnian and Croatian forces made further military advances in the region, in Operation Sana and Operation Mistral 2.

== Legal proceedings ==
=== International Tribunal ===
The ICTY indicted Slobodan Milošević for participating in a joint criminal enterprise, because he "planned, instigated, ordered, committed or otherwise aided and abetted the planning, preparation or execution of persecutions of non-Serbs, principally Bosnian Muslim and Bosnian Croats" and "aided and abetted the planning, preparation or execution of the extermination, murder and wilful killings of non-Serbs, principally Bosnian Muslims and Bosnian Croats", among them within the territories of Bihać.

General Ratko Mladić was also indicted because he "planned, instigated, ordered, committed or otherwise aided and abetted the planning, preparation or execution of the persecution of the Bosnian Muslim, Bosnian Croat or other non-Serb populations", among them in Bihać-Ripač.

=== Domestic trials ===
The government of Bosnia-Herzegovina charged Fikret Abdić with the deaths of 121 civilians, three POWs and the wounding of 400 civilians in the Bihać region. Croatian authorities arrested him and put him on trial. In 2002, he was sentenced to 20 years in prison for war crimes committed in the area of the "Bihać pocket". In 2005, the Croatian Supreme Court reduced his sentence to 15 years. After having served ten years of his fifteen-year sentence, Abdić was released on 9 March 2012 and upon leaving prison he was greeted by 3,000 of his supporters.

In 2012, the Bihać Cantonal court sentenced five former soldiers of the VRS to a total of 56.5 years in prison for murdering 25 Bosniak civilians in the villages of Duljci and Orašac in September 1992. In 2013, the Constitutional Court of Bosnia and Herzegovina issued a decision that equated the rights of former soldiers of the NOZB with those of the members of the ARBiH and the HVO.

== See also ==
- Siege of Sarajevo
- Siege of Goražde
- Siege of Srebrenica
- Siege of Mostar

== Books ==
- Gow, James (2003). The Serbian Project and Its Adversaries: A Strategy of War Crimes. McGill-Queen's Press. ISBN 978-0-7735-2385-2.
- Ramet, Sabrina P. (2006). The Three Yugoslavias: State-Building And Legitimation, 1918–2005. Indiana University Press. ISBN 978-0-2533-4656-8.
- Judah, Tim (2000). The Serbs: History, Myth, and the Destruction of Yugoslavia. Yale University Press. ISBN 978-0-3000-8507-5.
- Central Intelligence Agency, Office of Russian and European Analysis (2002). Balkan Battlegrounds: A Military History of the Yugoslav Conflict, 1990–1995. Washington, D.C.: Central Intelligence Agency. ISBN 978-0160664724. OCLC 50396958.
