= Leaders of the Yugoslav Wars =

Political and military figures in the Yugoslav wars

The Leaders of the Yugoslav Wars listed below comprise the important political and military figures of the Yugoslav wars.

== Bosnia and Herzegovina ==
- Alija Izetbegović as the president of Republic of Bosnia and Herzegovina between 1990 and 1996.
- Haris Silajdžić was from 1990 to 1993 the foreign minister of Bosnia and Herzegovina and served between 1993 and 1996 as the prime minister.
- Sefer Halilović was the Chief of Staff of the Army of the Republic of Bosnia and Herzegovina (ARBiH) from 1992 to 1993.
- Rasim Delić was the Chief of Staff of the Army of the Republic of Bosnia and Herzegovina (ARBiH) from 1993 to 1995.
- Enver Hadžihasanović was the commander of the ARBiH 3rd Corps and later served as the Chief of the Supreme Command Staff.
- Jovan Divjak was the commander of ARBiH forces in Sarajevo at the beginning of the war (1992–1993) and later served as deputy commander of the ARBiH Headquarters.
- Atif Dudaković was the commander of the Bosnian 5th Corps.
- Mehmed Alagić was the commander of the Bosanska Krajina Operational Group and later the ARBiH 7th Corps.
- Mustafa Hajrulahović was the commander of the Bosnian 1st Corps and later intelligence chief in the Bosnian government.
- Naser Orić lead the ARBiH 28th Division and commanded the defenses of Srebrenica.
- Blaž Kraljević was the commander of Croatian Defence Forces (HOS). Bosnian President Alija Izetbegović appointed him to be a member of Bosnian Army's Headquarters.

== AP Western Bosnia ==
- Fikret Abdić was the president of AP Western Bosnia.
- Zlatko Jušić was the prime minister of AP Western Bosnia
- Hasib Hodžić was the Chief of the General Staff of the National Defence of the Autonomous Province of Western Bosnia.

== Croatia ==
- Franjo Tuđman was the president of Croatia from 1990 until his death in 1999.
- Gojko Šušak was the Croatian Minister of Defense from 1991 to 1998.
- Stjepan Mesić was general secretary of HDZ and the first prime minister of Croatia in 1990. He became speaker of the Croatian parliament in 1992 but stepped down and left HDZ in 1994 because of their policy in Bosnia and Herzegovina.
- Anton Tus was a Croatian Army general and the first Chief of the General Staff of Croatia's armed forces from 1991 to 1992.
- Janko Bobetko was a Croatian Army general and Chief of the General Staff from 1992 until his retirement in 1995.
- Zvonimir Červenko was a Croatian Army general and the chief of General Staff between 1995 and 1996.
- Ante Gotovina was a Lieutenant General in the Croatian Army and commander of Croatian forces during Operation Storm and Operation Mistral 2.
- Mile Dedaković was the commander of the 204th Vukovar Brigade and the city of Vukovar's defenses during the 1991 Battle of Vukovar.

== Herzeg-Bosnia ==
- Mate Boban was the president of Herzeg-Bosnia from 1991 to 1994 following the Washington agreement.
- Dario Kordić was the political leader of Bosnian Croats in Central Bosnia and a HVO military commander.
- Jadranko Prlić was the prime minister of Herzeg-Bosnia.
- Valentin Ćorić was the interior minister of Herzeg-Bosnia.
- Bruno Stojić was the minister of defense of Herzeg-Bosnia.
- Milivoj Petković was the commander of the Croatian Defence Council (HVO).
- Slobodan Praljak was a Major General in the HVO and commander of the Croatian forces around Mostar.

== Kosovo ==
- Ibrahim Rugova was President of the first Republic of Kosovo, would go on to be the first President of Kosovo.
- Adem Jashari was the founder and leader of the Kosovo Liberation Army.
- Hamëz Jashari was the co-founder of the Kosovo Liberation Army and brother of Adem Jashari.
- Agim Ramadani was one of the main commanders of the Kosovo Liberation Army that fought in Koshare.
- Ramush Haradinaj was an officer and one of the leaders of the Kosovo Liberation Army.
- Hashim Thaçi was the leader of the most powerful function in the Kosovo Liberation Army and first prime minister of Kosovo.

== Republika Srpska ==
- Radovan Karadžić was the President of the Republika Srpska from 1992 to 1996. He was also the founder and first leader of Serbian Democratic Party (SDS).
- Biljana Plavšić was the Vice President of the Republic of Srpska from 1992 to 1996. Following the war she succeeded Radovan Karadžić as the 2nd President of the Republic of Srpska in 1996.
- Ratko Mladić was the commander of the Republic of Srpska Army (VRS).
- Stanislav Galić was the commander of Serbian forces in and around Sarajevo from 1992 to 1994.
- Dragomir Milošević was the commander of Serbian forces in and around Sarajevo from 1994 to 1995.
- Dragan Obrenović was a senior officer and commander in the Yugoslav People's Army (JNA) and later the Republic of Srpska Army (VRS).
- Milan Lukić was a commander in the paramilitary group "White Eagles" and was a prominent figure in the 1992 takeover and subsequent ethnic cleansing of eastern Bosnia.

== Republic of Serbian Krajina ==
- Milan Martić was a military and political leader of the Republic of Serbian Krajina. Martić held various leadership positions, including President, Minister of Defence and Minister of Internal Affairs.
- Milan Babić was the 1st President of the Republic of Serbian Krajina, and later served as the last Prime Minister of the Serbian Krajina.
- Mile Mrkšić was a general in the JNA and later the Commander in Chief of the Serbian Army of Krajina (SVK).
- Goran Hadžić was the 2nd President of the Serbian Krajina the leader of the Serbs in eastern Slavonia

== Federal Republic of Yugoslavia ==
- Slobodan Milošević was the President of Serbia from 1989 to 1997. Later he served as the 3rd President of FR Yugoslavia from 1997 until his overthrow in 2000.
- Momir Bulatović was the President of the Republic of Montenegro from 1990 to 1998 and then Prime Minister of FR Yugoslavia from 1998 to 2000.
- Milo Đukanović was the Prime Minister of the Republic of Montenegro from 1991 to 1998 and the 2nd President of Montenegro from 1998 to 2003.
- Borisav Jović was a close ally and advisor of Slobodan Milošević and served as the Serbian member of the collective Presidency of Yugoslavia during the late 1980s and early 1990s. He served as the Vice President of the Yugoslav Presidency from 1989 to 1990 and then as the President of Yugoslavia from 1990 to 1991.
- Jovica Stanišić was head of the State Security Service (SDB) from 1992 to 1998.
- Veljko Kadijević was the Minister of Defence in the Yugoslav government from 1988 to 1992.
- Blagoje Adžić was a general and Chief of the General Staff of the JNA from 1989 to 1992.
- Života Panić was a prominent JNA general and was the last acting minister of defense and army chief of staff in the Yugoslav government. Commander of JNA forces in the battle of Vukovar.
- Vojislav Šešelj was the founder of the nationalist Serbian Radical Party and its paramilitary "White Eagles" that served in both Bosnia and Croatia.
- Željko "Arkan" Ražnatović was the commander of the Serb Volunteer Guard paramilitary, also known as "Arkans Tigers" that fought in both Croatia and Bosnia. He was also the biggest organized crime figure in the Balkans during the 90s.

== Russian Federation ==
- Boris Yeltsin was the first president of the post-Soviet Russian Federation from 1991 until his resignation in 1999.

== Slovenia ==
- Milan Kučan was the first President of Slovenia.
- Lojze Peterle was the first Prime Minister of Slovenia.
- Janez Janša was Minister of Defense of Slovenia.
- Igor Bavčar was Minister of Interior of Slovenia.

== United States ==
- George H. W. Bush was the 41st President of the United States from 1989 to 1993.
- Bill Clinton was the 42nd President of the United States from 1993 to 2001.
- James Baker was the United States Secretary of State from 1989 to 1992 in the early stages of the Yugoslav Wars.
- Warren Christopher was the United States Secretary of State from 1993 to 1997 between the periods of the Washington and Dayton Agreements.
- Madeleine Albright was the United States Secretary of State from 1997 to 2001 during the Kosovo War.

== NATO ==
- Wesley Clark was the Supreme Allied Commander Europe from 1997 to 2000.
- Willy Claes was the Secretary General of NATO from 1994 to 1995.
- Javier Solana was the Secretary General of NATO from 1995 to 1999.
- Manfred Wörner was the Secretary General of NATO from 1988 to 1994.
- Leighton W. Smith was the Commander in Chief of U.S. Naval Forces Europe and Allied Forces Southern Europe from 1994 to 1995.
- Jeremy M. Boorda was the Commander in Chief of U.S. Naval Forces Europe and Allied Forces Southern Europe from 1991 to 1994.
- Hulusi Akar war the Commander of Turkish Armed Forces the Bosnia and Kosovo from 1992-1999

== Pakistan ==
- Nawaz Sharif was the Prime Minister of Pakistan from 1990 to 1993.
- Wasim Sajjad was the President of Pakistan from 1992 to 1993.
- Farooq Leghari was the President of Pakistan from 1993 to 1997.
- Javed Nasir was the Director General of the Inter-Services Intelligence from 1992 to 1993.
- Javed Ashraf Qazi was the Director General of the Inter-Services Intelligence from 1993 to 1995.

== United Nations ==
- David Pennefather was the Commander of the United Nations Rapid Reaction Force during the Bosnian War.
- Rupert Smith was the Commander of UNPROFOR during 1995.

== See also ==
- Yugoslav Wars
- Bosnian War
- Croatian War of Independence
- Ten-Day War
