= Capture of Vrnograč =

1995 event in the Bosnian War

- Part of the Bosnian War and Intra-Bosnian Muslim War
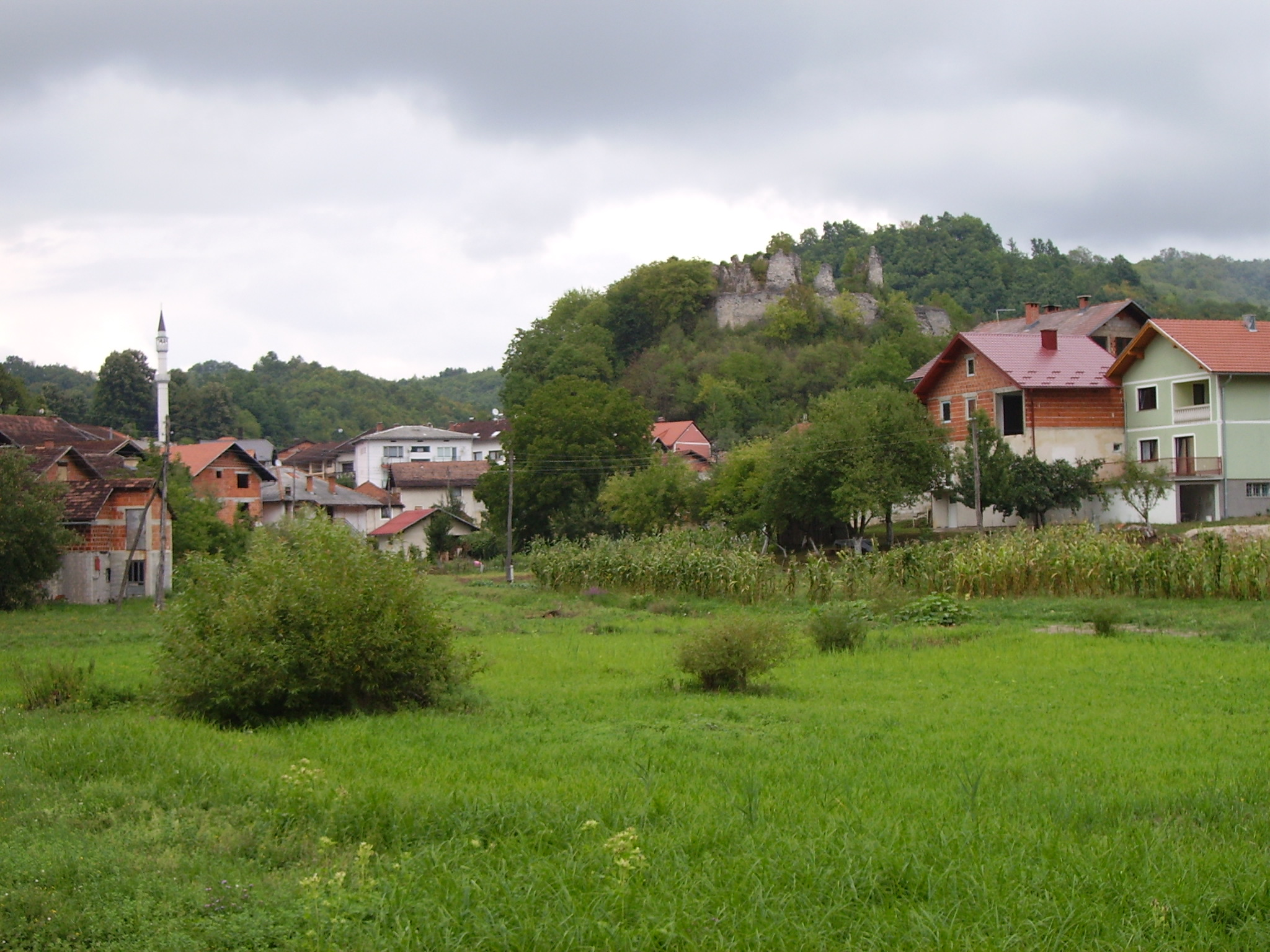
Date	January – 21 June 1995
Location	Velika Kladuša region, Bosnia and Herzegovina
Result	ARBiH forces withdrew from Vrnograč, which was then occupied by Operational Group "Pauk"
Territorial changes	Vrnograč captured

Belligerents
APWB and SVK forces, supported by elements of the VJ and RDB	Republic of Bosnia and Herzegovina

Commanders and leaders
Mile Novaković "Raja" Božović	Atif Dudaković

Units involved
Operational Group "Pauk"; NOZB (2nd brigade); SVK (two tactical groups); Elements of the VJ Corps of Special Units; Elements of the Serbian RDB Special Operations Unit; RDB-controlled Black Legion of the Serb Volunteer Guard	Army of the Republic of Bosnia and Herzegovina; 5th Corps; 505th Bužim Brigade; 506th Liberation Brigade

Strength
5,000 with artillery support	4,000–5,000

Casualties and losses
Unknown	Unknown

In the first half of 1995, the important town of Vrnograč in Bosnia and Herzegovina was captured by a combined force known as Operational Group "Pauk" (Spider) (OG "Pauk"), as part of the Bosnian and intra-Bosnian Muslim Wars. The aim of the operation was to eliminate the Army of the Republic of Bosnia and Herzegovina (ARBiH) salient just south of the town of Velika Kladuša, then capture Vrnograč, which is located about 12 km (7.5 mi) east of Velika Kladuša.

OG "Pauk" was commanded by General Mile Novaković of the Army of the Republic of Serb Krajina (SVK), leading troops contributed by: the unrecognised breakaway proto-state within Bosnia and Herzegovina known as the Autonomous Province of Western Bosnia (APWB); and the Republic of Serb Krajina (RSK) – an unrecognised breakaway proto-state inside Croatia on the adjacent border with Bosnia and Herzegovina – along with small numbers of elite Yugoslav Army (VJ) and Serbian State Security (RDB) special operations troops. They were opposed by the 5th Corps of the ARBiH commanded by Atif Dudaković.

The fighting dragged on from January to June, and consisted almost entirely of unrelenting fighting in which the ARBiH defenders were slowly pushed back by OG "Pauk" which had a considerable firepower advantage. A series of villages in the Velika Kladuša region fell, eventually the defenders could no longer hold Vrnograč, and on 21 June they withdrew 2 km (1.2 mi) past the town where they established a new defensive line. Fighting in the area recommenced in July.

== Background ==
At the beginning of 1995, a shaky ceasefire began across most of Bosnia and Herzegovina. Fighting continued along the perimeter of the surrounded Bihać enclave in the north west – the territory of the unrecognised breakaway proto-state within Bosnia and Herzegovina known as the Autonomous Province of Western Bosnia (APWB) led by Fikret Abdić. In the northern part of the enclave, the 5th Corps of the Army of the Republic of Bosnia and Herzegovina (ARBiH) commanded by Atif Dudaković faced Abdić's rebel forces. Abdić was dependent on significant support from the Republic of Serb Krajina (SVK) – an unrecognised breakaway proto-state inside Croatia on the border with Bosnia and Herzegovina – along with small numbers of elite Yugoslav Army (VJ) and Serbian State Security (RDB) special operations troops. The Yugoslav and Serb forces had re-established the APWB during their operations in December 1994, and with Abdić their combined objective was to expand the APWB to make it more viable and then to extend Abdić's control over the whole enclave around Bihać.

To achieve these objectives, Abdić's Serb commanders – General Mile Novaković from the SVK and the Serbian RDB officer "Raja" Božović – planned a series of operations. The initial aim was to eliminate the salient just south of the town of Velika Kladuša occupied by the ARBiH 5th Corps, followed by the capture of the important town of Vrnograč about 12 km (7.5 mi) east of Velika Kladuša. In the 1991 census, Vrnograč had 1,201 people, 92 per cent of whom were Bosnian Muslims. The capture of Vrnograč would secure the northern third of the enclave, and secure Abdić's sway over about the same amount of territory he had controlled in late 1993 at the peak of his power. Having secured the area around Velika Kladuša, the APWB and SVK forces would then advance on the Cazin-Todorovo and Bužim areas, and if successful this would almost certainly lead to the defeat of Dudaković's 5th Corps.

== Opposing forces ==
Abdić's Serb commanders had at their disposal a force known as Operation Group "Pauk" (Spider), which was commanded by Novaković. It consisted of three brigades of Abdić's Muslim troops, some 5,000 personnel all together. This included two tactical groups of 1,000–1,500 men from the SVK 21st and 39th Banija Corps, and about 500 troops drawn from the VJ Corps of Special Units, the RDB Special Operations Unit known as the "Red Berets", and an element of the RDB-controlled Serbian Volunteer Guard (also known as "Arkan's Tigers" after the nickname of its commander Željko Ražnatović). The element itself was known as the "Black Legion", and was commanded by Ražnatović's deputy, Milorad Ulemek. The latter units were deployed in platoon and company-sized elements, and it was intended that they would provide the spearhead for the regular APWB and SVK infantry. Indirect fire support was available from an SVK artillery group across the border, with a battalion of SVK armour in direct support.

The defences of the ARBiH 5th Corps under Dudaković in the area were centred on the 505th Bužim Mountain Brigade, with its flanking formations consisting of the far less capable 506th Velika Kladuša Mountain Brigade and the 510th Liberation Brigade. Elements of most of the 5th Corps' other brigades were also part of the defensive force, which totalled about 4,000 to 5,000 troops. The rest of the 5th Corps was committed to small- to medium-scale operations against the Bosnian Serb Army (VRS) 2nd Krajina Corps on the frontline between Bihać, the Grabež plateau and Bosanska Krupa.

== Fighting and aftermath ==
The offensive commenced in late January with OG "Pauk"'s attack on the ARBiH salient around Podzvizd and Mala Kladuša. In more than a week of fighting, the offensive gained almost no ground, and a second attack a week later was even less successful. In the second half of February the attacking forces achieved better results, and managed to advance south east of Velika Kladusa towards the villages of Podzvizd, Elezovići and Šumatac. RDB troops under Božović captured some territory to the north near Podzvizd in late February, but the ARBiH 505th and 506th Brigades soon drove them out. Attacking from the west around Johovica, APWB and SVK units managed to capture and retain small areas around Mala Kladuša. These slow gains were made by APWB and SVK infantry grinding away in hard fighting and backed by superior firepower.

In March, the attacking forces began to gradually capture ground. In the first week of March, OG "Pauk" advanced in the north, slowly taking territory from the stubborn defenders. By 21 March, the Yugoslav, Serb and APWB troops had taken most of the Podzvizd salient and began a thrust towards Vrnograč. They attacked towards the town on two axes; one north east from Mala Kladuša, and the other south from the Bosanska Bojna area. The nature of the fighting remained the same, slow and grinding progress, incrementally gaining ground. In mid-April, somewhat of a breakthrough occurred when the APWB/SVK troops captured a series of villages and advanced about a kilometre towards Vrnograč from the west. In May there was no major fighting, but some low-level skirmishing saw the APWB capture a couple of villages. The defence of Vrnograč began to collapse in mid-June, when the ARBiH 505th and 506th brigades pulled out of the town under unrelenting pressure. In the following week, OG "Pauk" pushed another 2 km (1.2 mi) past the town before the 5th Corps defences solidified. Major fighting between the APWB/SVK forces and the 5th Corps then paused until July.
