= Operation Pećigrad '94 =

Military operation in Bosnia and Herzegovina

Operation Pećigrad 94
- Part of the Bosnian War
Date	11 June – 4 August 1994
Location	Pećigrad, Bosnia and Herzegovina
Result	ARBiH victory: Bosniak Forces capture Pećigrad

Belligerents
Republic of Bosnia and Herzegovina	Autonomous Province of Western Bosnia

Commanders and leaders
(Bosnia and Herzegovina) Atif Dudaković	Fikret Abdić Nevzad Đerić †

Units involved
Army of the Republic of Bosnia and Herzegovina; 5th Corps	National Defence of the APZB

Strength
Unknown	Unknown

Casualties and losses
Unknown	800+ captured

Operation Pećigrad 94 (Serbo-Croatian: Operacija Pećigrad 94) was a military operation conducted by the Army of the Republic of Bosnia and Herzegovina (ARBiH) 5th Corps against the forces of the Autonomous Province of Western Bosnia (APZB) led by Fikret Abdić. The operation took place from 11 June to 4 August 1994 and was a decisive step in the Bosnian Government’s campaign to eliminate Abdic's separatist regime in northwest Bosnia.

== Background ==
In early June 1994, following a ceasefire with Bosnian Serb forces, the ARBiH 5th Corps redirected its full attention to Abdic's forces. On 11 June, APZB forces attacked government-held territory, making initial gains. By 13 June, the 5th Corps had counterattacked, capturing approximately 30 square kilometers and advancing toward Pećigrad, a key town on the route from Cazin to Abdic's stronghold of Velika Kladuša.

== The Operation ==
Pećigrad became the focus of intense fighting as both sides recognized its strategic importance. The APZB 4th Brigade, considered Abdic’s best formation, defended the town tenaciously. By 22 June, the 5th Corps had surrounded Pećigrad on three sides, trapping the defending forces. In a remarkable strategic deception known as "Tigar-Sloboda 94," Dudaković’s forces staged a mock mutiny, luring Abdic to supply weapons and reinforcements, which were then seized by the 5th Corps. This provided the government forces with critical additional arms and ammunition while weakening Abdic’s internal support.

By early August, the ARBiH concentrated fire on Pećigrad. On 1st August, 4th Brigade commander Nevzad Đerić refused a surrender offer and was killed and on 4 August, the town fell after commander of special squad "Zenga" Besim Muhamedagić had signed the capitulation offer. Over 800 APZB defenders were captured, clearing the way for the 5th Corps to advance on Velika Kladuša.

== See also ==
- Operation Grmeč
- Operation Tiger
