= Special Unit Golubovi =

Special military unit of the APZB

Doves Golubovi
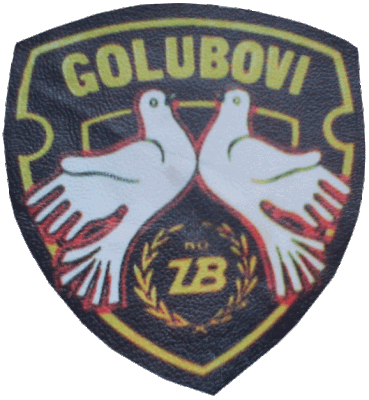
- Active: 1993-1995
- Country: Autonomous Province of Western Bosnia
- Branch: National Defence of the APZB
- Type: Paramilitary; Special forces
- Role: Reconnaissance; Territorial Defence; Raiding
- Engagements: Intra-Bosnian Muslim War: Mala Kladuša offensive; Operation Vrnograč 95

Commanders
- Notable commanders: Zlatko Hušidić

Golubovi was a special forces unit of the National Defence of the Autonomous Province of Western Bosnia, which was split up into nine other Brigades numbering 10,000 soldiers. It was commanded by Zlatko Hušidić. It operated from 1993 to 1994, most notably in the village of Vrnograč, alongside other units such as Ajkini and Metalni. The unit had been destroyed by the Army of the Republic of Bosnia and Herzegovina in 1994, during Operation Tiger-Sloboda. It was reformed in 1995, seeing action again in Vrnograč and advancing to Bužim until their defeat in 1995.

== History ==
Before the Autonomous Province of Western Bosnia had even been established, Zlatko Hušidić was a soldier in the Territorial Defence Force of the Republic of Bosnia and Herzegovina and later a commander in the ARBiH in the 521st Brigade. in 1993 Hušidić joined the National Defence of the Autonomous Province of Western Bosnia, In September 1993 he was appointed to commander of the Golubovi unit, until the units destruction in 1994.

== See also ==
- Fikret Abdić
- 5th Corps
