= Battle of Velika Kladuša (1993) =

Battle of the Intra-Bosnian Muslim War

- Part of the Bosnian War and Inter-Bosnian Muslim War
Date	18 October 1993
Location	Velika Kladuša, Bosnia and Herzegovina
Result	Western Bosnian victory

Belligerents
Autonomous Province of Western Bosnia	Republic of Bosnia and Herzegovina

Commanders and leaders
Fikret Abdić	(Bosnia and Herzegovina) Atif Dudaković (Bosnia and Herzegovina) Ramiz Dreković

Units involved
National Defence of the APZB	(Bosnia and Herzegovina) 5th Corps

Casualties and losses
Unknown	(Bosnia and Herzegovina) Unknown

The Battle of Velika Kladuša was one of the first battles in the Intra-Bosnian Muslim War. The goal of the 5th Corps was the abolition of Western Bosnia, which had been established a few weeks before the battle of Velika Kladuša. The attack did not succeed and Western Bosnia was a thorn in the eye of the 5th Corps until Operation Storm.

== Background ==
Fikret Abdić was the winner of the popular vote to head the government of Bosnia in 1990 but surrendered to Alija Izetbegović under an undisclosed agreement.

In 1993, according to journalist Anthony Loyd, Abdić decided to try to carve out a little state for himself and succeeded in recruiting enough followers to make his dreams a reality. Abdić was able to hold power over his mini-state. The 5th Corps was strictly against Abdić's idea and was preparing to abolish the APZB and destroy the NOZB.

== Fighting ==
Early in the morning on 18 October 1993, the column of the 5th Corps under the command of Ramiz Dreković headed towards Velika Kladuša with the task of eliminating the APZB as a military threat. The motivation was even greater for the 5th Corps attack because the APZB was not in an alliance with the Serbs, Abdić was alone. When the 5th Corps approached Velika Kladuša, they began shelling the city. ARBiH soldiers tried to break into the city, but the NOZB prevented them from doing so. The Autonomists held off the 5th Corps offensive. And they started a counter-offensive, when the 5th Corps got into that situation they retreated. After that, Fikret wanted an alliance with Serbs who would arm the NOZB and help it survive.

An important event took place on 22 October 1993, when Fikret Abdić, Radovan Karadžić and Slobodan Milosević met, where decisions on cooperation were made, showed a great commitment to normal relations and peace between the Muslim side of Fikret Abdić and the Serbian sides.
