= Jasmin Kulenović =

Army officer (1957–1995)

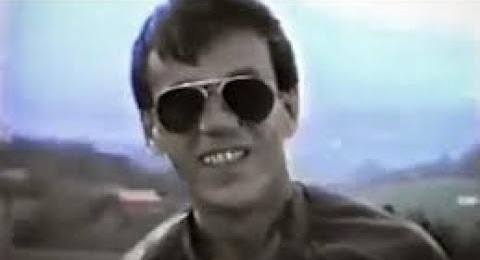
- Born: November 12, 1957; Bihać, Socialist Republic of Bosnia and Herzegovina
- Died: 10 January 1995 (aged 37); Podzvizd, Bosnia and Herzegovina
- Military career
- Allegiance: Republic of Bosnia and Herzegovina
- Branch: Army of the Republic of Bosnia and Herzegovina
- Service years: 1992-1995
- Rank: Major
- Nickname: Havarija (English: "great trouble")
- Units: Battalion in 501st Brigade (ARBiH); 5th Corps Reconnaissance-Sabotage Company - "Havarija"
- Conflicts: Bosnian War; Maljevac attack; Siege of Bihać (1992-95); Operation "Breza '94"; Operation Spider; Mala Kladuša offensive †
- Awards: Order of the Golden Lily

Jasmin Kulenović (12 November 1957 - 10 January 1995) also known as Havarija was a commander in the Army of the Republic of Bosnia and Herzegovina. Kulenović commanded 5th Corps Reconnaissance-Sabotage Company which got nicknamed 5. IDČ - “Havarija”, as well as a battalion in 501st Brigade (ARBiH) beforehand.

== Early life and career ==
Jasmin Kulenović was born in Bihać on 12 November 1957, after finishing with school he became a medical technician in his home town.

== Military career ==
Before the start of the Bosnian War, Kulenović joined the Territorial Defence Force of the Republic of Bosnia and Herzegovina in April. Kulenović fought for the ToBiH until the organization of military units in Bihać, Havarija was wounded 2-3 times during the Bosnian War. he led a battalion in the 501st Glorious Mountain Brigade, in one of Kulenović’s actions, he along with other Bosnian Army personnel attacked a several times larger group of VRS soldiers in Maljevac neutralising them, garnering him the nickname “Havarija” (English: "great trouble", meaning: "He caused great trouble.") Kulenović along with his men were appointed to hold the line against the oncoming wave of VRS soldiers led by Ratko Mladić during Operation "Breza '94", which was a success.

== Death and legacy ==
On January 10, 1995, during a large offensive against Western Bosnian and the Army of Republika Srpska Kulenović was fighting in Velika Kladuša with the 5th Corps (Army of the Republic of Bosnia and Herzegovina), during an intense clash with NOZB-VRS soldiers on Podzvizd, Kulenović was Killed in action.

Kulenović was posthumously awarded the Order of the Golden Lily for his contributions and bravery during the Bosnian War, including his role in the liberation of Velika Kladuša and Sokolac. Even 30 years after Kulenović's death, the city of Bihać holds a remembrance days for Jasmin Kulenović and other prominent deceased soldiers of 5th Sabotage-Reconnaissance Company "Havarija".

== See also ==
- Izet Nanić
- Atif Dudaković
