= Western Bosnia =

Western Bosnia may refer to:

- Western Bosnia
- Autonomous Province of Western Bosnia, a self-proclaimed autonomous entity that existed during the Bosnian War
