= Intra-Bosnian Muslim War =

Ethnic civil war part of the Bosnian War

- Part of the Bosnian War
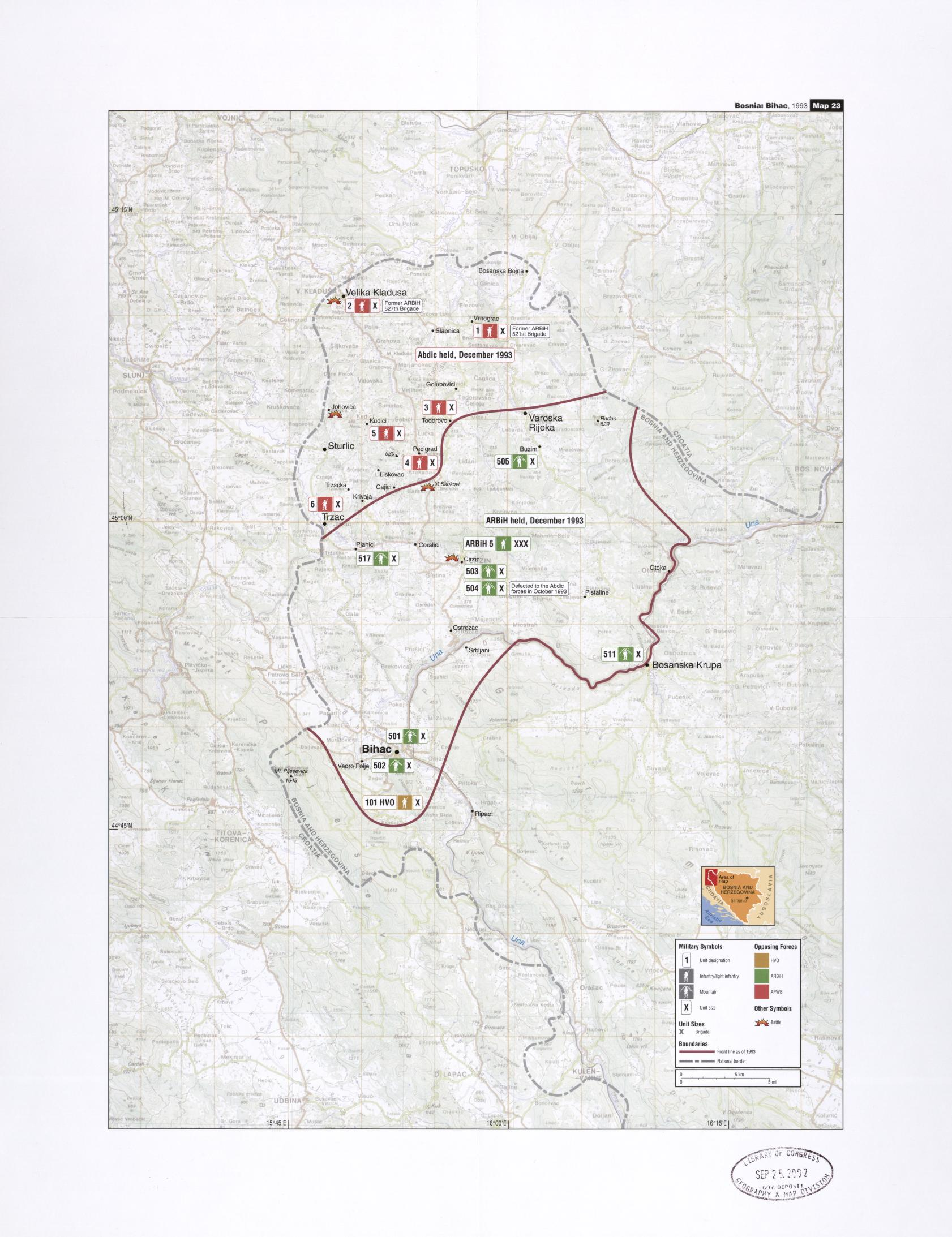
- Map of the Bihać enclave (under the control of the Bosnian-Herzegovinian government), surrounded by the Republic of Serbian Krajina (in the northwest), the Autonomous Province of Western Bosnia (to the north) and the Republika Srpska (to the southeast)
Date	27 September 1993 – 21 August 1995
Location	Bosanska Krajina
Result	Central government victory
Territorial changes	The central government regains control over all the former territory of APZB

Belligerents
Autonomous Province of Western Bosnia	Republic of Bosnia and Herzegovina

Commanders and leaders
Fikret Abdić; Zlatko Jušić; Hasib Hodžić; Zumret Brkić	Alija Izetbegović; Ramiz Dreković; Atif Dudaković; Jasmin Kulenović †; Izet Nanić †; Nijaz Miljković

Units involved
NOZB	ARBiH; 5th Corps

Strength
10,000	10,000

Casualties and losses
558 killed 202+ wounded 4+ injured	672 killed 1,638 seriously wounded 3,981 slightly wounded

The Intra-Bosnian Muslim War (Serbo-Croatian: Unutarmuslimanski rat) was a civil war fought between the Army of the Republic of Bosnia and Herzegovina loyal to central government of Alija Izetbegović in Sarajevo and the Autonomous Province of Western Bosnia loyal to Fikret Abdić in Velika Kladuša from 1993 to 1995 in the region of the western Bosnia. The war ended with the victory of the Army of the Republic of Bosnia and Herzegovina and the abolishment of Western Bosnia.

== Background ==
The Cazinska Krajina region, located in the far north-western part of Bosanska Krajina, had a slightly higher GDP per capita than the average for the Socialist Republic of Bosnia and Herzegovina. Predominantly populated by Bosnian Muslims, the region encompasses the municipalities of Bihać, Cazin, and Velika Kladuša. To the north and west, it borders Croatia, while to the south and east, it is separated from the broader Muslim population by Serb- and Croat-majority areas.

Fikret Abdić founded the agricultural company Agrokomerc in Velika Kladuša, which, during the 1970s and 1980s, transformed Cazinska Krajina from an impoverished rural area into a prosperous regional economy. Agrokomerc became Yugoslavia’s largest food-processing conglomerate, employing approximately 13,000 people and operating numerous factories and retail outlets across the country. The company’s success significantly improved the standard of living in the region, and Abdić gained a strong personal following, earning the nickname "Babo" (English: Dad).

With the transition from a one-party system, the League of Communists of Yugoslavia lost power to nationalist parties. In Bosnia and Herzegovina, Serbs aligned with the Serb Democratic Party (SDS), Croats with the Croatian Democratic Union (HDZ), while Muslims consolidated around the Party of Democratic Action (SDA), led by Alija Izetbegović. Abdić, previously a member of the League of Communists, joined the SDA and became one of its leading figures.

In Cazinska Krajina, where the SDA was initially founded by Mirsad Veladžić and Irfan Ljubijankić, two members of the pan-Islamist movement, it only became a mass movement after Abdić announced his support for it in September 1990.

In the Bosnian general election held in November 1990, Abdić and Izetbegović were the SDA candidates for Muslim seats in the seven-member Presidency. Abdić won 1,040,307 votes, versus just 874,213 for Izetbegović. Both were elected as Muslim representatives in the seven-member presidency, alongside Ejup Ganić, who secured a seat as a representative of ethnic minorities. However, due to opposition from the party’s hardline faction, Abdić was sidelined, and Izetbegović assumed the leading role in the government.

=== Political Struggles and the start of the Bosnian War ===
In May 1992, Izetbegović was detained by the Yugoslav People's Army (JNA) upon returning from an unsuccessful peace conference in Lisbon. Meanwhile, reports surfaced that Abdić had successfully travelled from Bihać to Sarajevo, crossing multiple frontlines without difficulty. This fuelled suspicions within the SDA leadership, particularly among Ganić and his faction, who feared Abdić was attempting to stage a coup with the backing of Belgrade and the JNA high command.

During a crisis meeting at the presidency building, Interior Minister Alija Delimustafić proposed appointing a new president more willing to negotiate with the JNA. This was firmly opposed by Ganić and the party’s hardliners, who viewed any form of compromise as betrayal. Although no direct evidence linked Abdić to a coup attempt, his political influence in Sarajevo was effectively curtailed.

In September 1992, Abdić returned to Bihać and assumed an advisory role in the District Assembly. His primary objective was to keep the Bihać Pocket out of the war, as the conflict escalated across Bosnia and Herzegovina.

On 27 April 1993, Krajina Serbs launched an attack near Bosanska Bojna, capturing a significant portion of land. While initially presented as a localised offensive by displaced Serbs, further investigation revealed it was a coordinated military operation involving Serb forces from both Bosnia and Krajina. The 5th Corps repelled the attack, confirming its strategic nature.

On 6 May 1993, United Nations Security Council Resolution 842 declared the Bihać pocket a "safe area". This pocket encompassed a vast territory with a predominantly Muslim population of approximately 250,000. It was geographically isolated, bordered by the self-proclaimed Republic of Serbian Krajina (RSK) in Croatia and Republika Srpska (RS), with a 118 km-long border with RSK. The elimination of this military stronghold was viewed as a crucial step toward unifying the two Serb-controlled territories.

After Bihać was designated a UN "safe area", Abdić determined that the United Nations lacked the means to enforce this status, leaving the region vulnerable. Given the 5th Corps' limited operational capacity, he concluded that negotiating with the Serbs was the most effective course of action. Abdić engaged in talks with Serb representatives, leading to UNPROFOR-proposed demilitarisation of the contested Bosanska Bojna area. The plan involved deploying French UN troops as a buffer, supported by UN civil police (UNCIVPOL) to maintain order. Resettlement efforts for displaced inhabitants were also proposed but deemed overly ambitious.

As the Washington Accord failed to gain traction in Sarajevo, Abdić grew increasingly concerned. He believed Izetbegović had rejected it solely because the Serbs had accepted it, exacerbating their tensions. This culminated in a heated debate at a Presidential Council meeting on 23 June 1993, where the idea of partitioning Bosnia and Herzegovina into three ethnic provinces was discussed. Abdić supported the proposal, arguing that partition was already a reality. However, Ganić vehemently opposed it, insisting that the war must continue. Izetbegović took a similarly intransigent stance, calling for a boycott of peace talks in Geneva if partition remained on the agenda. On 28 June, both Izetbegović and Ganić walked out, leaving Abdić and the remaining presidency members uncertain.

On 15 July 1993, the Erdut Agreement allowed the UN to take control of key infrastructure in Croatia, momentarily easing tensions. However, as ceasefire agreements were negotiated among Muslim, Croat, and Serb leaders, renewed violence, such as the shelling of the Maslenica Bridge, highlighted the fragile nature of peace efforts. By August, the talks collapsed entirely, and the blockade of Sarajevo by Serb forces resumed. The situation further deteriorated when Izetbegović refused further discussions with Mate Boban until humanitarian access to Muslim communities was guaranteed.

The Owen–Stoltenberg plan caused significant tensions within the Collegial Presidency, with representatives of the civic parties opposing the plan but reluctant to continue a war that was devastating Bosnian society. Izetbegović and Ganić favoured renegotiating the plan, while Abdić advocated for its immediate and unconditional acceptance. Over the summer, Abdić resigned from the Collegial Presidency to return to his stronghold in Cazinska Krajina, where he clashed with local SDA leaders. Similar to the Vance–Owen Plan, the Owen–Stoltenberg Plan also sparked internal conflict among Bosnian Muslims.

Amidst these broader struggles, a significant internal conflict emerged in the Bihać region. Abdić capitalised on dissatisfaction with Sarajevo's governance. On 7 September, a committee was formed in Velika Kladuša advocating for an Autonomous Province of Western Bosnia within a proposed Union of Republics of Bosnia-Herzegovina. While this initiative initially gathered substantial signatures, further assessment indicated that support was largely confined to those with ties to Abdić's Agrokomerc business network rather than the wider population.

== Creation of Western Bosnia ==
On 27 September 1993, Abdić declared the Autonomous Province of Western Bosnia (APWB) in Velika Kladuša. The entity operated as a self-governing mini-state with its Prime Minister and Parliament. Abdić secured 50,000 signatures in favour of autonomy, along with 75% of local municipal council delegates. However, critics alleged that coercion by his police forces influenced the outcome. Despite these claims, he retained strong local support. Western Bosnia's supporters identified themselves as Muslims, unlike those aligned with the central government, who adopted the term Bosniaks during the war. Western Bosnians accused Sarajevo-backed Muslims of religious extremism, whereas they claimed to represent a multi-ethnic movement.

Abdić declared himself the commander of the 5th Corps of the Army of the Republic of Bosnia and Herzegovina, and invited all its soldiers under his command. His influence expanded when the 521st Brigade and 527th Brigades of the 5th Corps from Velika Kladuša defected to his side.

The new entity, located in the northern part of the Bihać Pocket, aligned politically and economically with Croatia, Yugoslavia, and the Krajina Serbs. On 22 October, Abdić signed a peace agreement in Belgrade with Radovan Karadžić and Milošević, who claimed that the pact would bring "peace to half of Bosnia". Shortly thereafter, Abdić reached a similar agreement with Croatian President Franjo Tuđman, even as Bosnian Croats faced increasing military pressure from the Bosnian government forces. This effectively isolated the 5th Corps in the region. On 7 November 1993, he met with Vladimir Lukić and Jadranko Prlić, the prime ministers of Republika Srpska and the Croatian Republic of Herzeg-Bosnia, respectively. During this meeting, the three leaders agreed on various political and economic initiatives, reinforcing Abdić's position as a significant factor in the regional conflict.

For the Serbs, neutralising the 5th Corps in Bihać was strategically significant. Simultaneously, Abdić aligned with Serb interests. At the time, Milošević entertained incorporating Western Bosnia into a hypothetical "future Yugoslavia". The Serbian State Security Service covertly provided military aid to Abdić's forces. By early 1994, Abdić's military consisted of six infantry brigades, comprising up to 10,000 men, as well as artillery units and tanks supplied by the Army of Republika Srpska.

=== Escalating tensions ===
Tensions escalated when Izetbegović ordered military rule in Bihać, prompting Abdić to call upon his supporters to resist what he perceived as a military dictatorship. His militia, supported by local police forces, took control of Cazin, forcing the 5th Corps to retreat to Bihać. Meanwhile, government troops deployed to suppress the uprising fired warning shots to disperse crowds but faced continued resistance. The situation worsened when soldiers encountered barricades in the village of Pjanići. A violent confrontation ensued as government troops stormed a local radio station, resulting in the death of a policeman. The civilian population was instructed to remain indoors.

Abdić justified his actions by stating that he sought to end his people's isolation and bring an end to the war, arguing that the local Muslim population was exhausted by prolonged conflict. However, Izetbegović condemned Abdić's actions as a betrayal, characterising them as a "stab in the back of our already wounded homeland". As a consequence, Abdić was dismissed from the Presidency of the Republic of Bosnia and Herzegovina.

== Conflict with the 5th Corps ==
The weekend of 2-3 October 1993 saw clashes between Abdić's followers and the 5th Corps. Shelling incidents were reported in areas such as Johovica near the Croatian border. The conflict extended to Velika Kladuša, Abdić's stronghold, exacerbating regional divisions. During the first week of the insurrection, it is estimated that up to a dozen people were killed before a general standoff ensued, as Muslim soldiers hesitated to fire on Muslim civilians.

Izetbegović demanded that Abdić rescind his decision or face a full military mobilisation against him. Abdić refused, declaring that surrender was not an option. In Bihać, several of Abdić's supporters were detained. On 16 October, the 5th Corps launched small-scale offensives towards Cazin and Velika Kladuša, achieving minor gains before the effort stalled due to continued support for Abdić.

To weaken Abdić's position, the government cut off power to the northern sector. However, UN negotiators intervened to restore electricity to essential services, including hospitals, bakeries, and water systems. At the time, Izetbegović seemed more focused on military campaigns in central Bosnia, possibly postponing further action against Abdić.

After a brief pause, the 5th Corps launched another offensive against Western Bosnian forces. On 12 November, the 5th Crops claimed to have captured the small town of Johovica, though Abdić's followers countered that government troops had been driven out and that 100 soldiers had been taken prisoner. With continued support from both Croatia and Serbia, Abdić appeared to have solidified his control over the northern part of the region.

=== December escalation and stalemate ===
On 4 December, Abdić's forces launched a ground offensive in the western part of the Bihać Pocket, deploying approximately 1,000 troops. In response, Dudaković strongly condemned the Krajina Serb authorities for allowing Abdić's troops to pass through their territory unimpeded for resupply. While this accusation was justifiable, his criticism of the UNPROFOR was less so. As in previous encounters, UN troops stationed in the area had limited capacity to intervene, instead focusing on monitoring the situation and later assisting in casualty evacuation.

During the early days of December, the Polish battalion of UNPROFOR found itself caught in the hostilities. The battalion primarily established dressing stations near the conflict zones, transporting wounded soldiers to the hospital in Vojnić and, when necessary, onward to Karlovac in Croatia.

By 8 December, the fighting had reached a stalemate, with neither side achieving significant territorial gains. However, Abdić's manoeuvres had forced Dudaković to divert troops to multiple new positions, exposing them to potential attacks from Bosnian Serb forces along the southern confrontation line. Both factions endured heavy casualties, with estimates exceeding 300 dead and 1,000 wounded.

The European Community Monitoring Mission (ECMM) swiftly intervened, advocating for an immediate ceasefire. EC monitors actively mediated between the warring sides, often under fire from Bosnian Serb artillery.

Despite the ongoing conflict, economic interests continued to play a pivotal role. In a remarkable development, on 29 December, Dudaković requested that the ECMM facilitate a meeting between himself and the Krajina Serbs' Lika Corps commander. The Lika region, adjacent to the Bihać Pocket, was a vital conduit for black-market trade. The meeting underscored the paradox of war: while hostilities persisted, commerce remained a priority for both factions, with military leaders willing to negotiate trade routes even amid active combat operations.

By January 1994, most of Cazinska Krajina was under the control of the 5th Corps. That same month, Abdić and Dudaković signed a ceasefire, which was broken on 18 February 1994 when Abdić launched an offensive against the 5th Corps. The fighting lasted until the summer of 1994, when Abdić's forces suffered heavy defeats, forcing 30,000 of his supporters to flee to neighbouring Croatia.

Throughout the winter and spring of 1994, intermittent clashes persisted between the 5th Corps and the Western Bosnian forces, as both sides tested each other's military strength. In the south, the 5th Corps maintained defensive positions along the Una River, facing off against the VRS 2nd Krajina Corps. However, the frontline eventually reached a stalemate.

=== Operation Tiger ===
On 8 July 1994, troops under the command of General Dudaković blocked the French UNPROFOR battalion in Bihać, citing the infiltration of "Abdić’s terrorists" into the city. The situation escalated into reported explosions and intense firefights in the city centre. Radio Bihać broadcast accounts of a mutiny within the 5th Corps, arrests of Dudaković's officers, and battles between "rebels" and forces loyal to Izetbegović.

By the end of the day, Radio Bihać reported that "rebels" had expelled Dudaković's soldiers from the village of Izačić, which was subsequently established as a base for a fictional 7th Brigade. In response, Abdić, believing the rebellion legitimate, dispatched truckloads of small arms, rocket launchers, and ammunition to support the supposed defectors. The "rebels" further invited Abdić to Izačić for a victory celebration, but he declined and instead sent his counterintelligence officer and a liaison officer from the VRS. These envoys delivered additional supplies, including weaponry and ammunition.

Subsequently, the "rebels" apprehended Abdić's envoys and their escort, seizing approximately 600 weapons, 100,000 rounds of ammunition, four tonnes of food, and four lorries. The operation, later revealed to be a tactical ruse, successfully combined elements of deception and execution. The staged "mutiny" was reinforced by simulated battles using blank cartridges, grenade explosions, and burning fires in Bihać. For Izetbegović, the operation "Tiger-Freedom-94" was considered a strategic victory with significant propaganda value, effectively serving as a public relations coup.

However, in December 1994, Velika Kladuša was again under Abdić's control. The 5th Corps, bolstered by the Bosniak-Croat alliance formed under the Washington Agreement of 1994, broke through Serb lines surrounding Bihać, strengthening Sarajevo’s position in the region.

== Collapse of Western Bosnia ==
On 26 July 1995, the Autonomous Province of Western Bosnia declared itself an independent Republic of Western Bosnia (RSB), signifying a complete political break from Izetbegović's government. On 4 August, the 5th Corps launched an offensive, successfully capturing Pećigrad. The advance of the 5th Corps encountered minimal resistance, as the Western Bosnian defence lines collapsed, resulting in the surrender of approximately 800 Western Bosnian soldiers.

On 5 August 1995, Abdić expressed his willingness to negotiate with the central government. However, the 5th Corps was directed by Izetbegović to achieve a military victory over Western Bosnia. To minimise civilian casualties, the central government offered an amnesty to Western Bosnia on 9 August 1995. Abdić declined to surrender, stating his intention to remain with his people and advocating for negotiations through intermediaries, including General Michael Rose and Krešimir Zubak, the President of the Federation of Bosnia and Herzegovina. However, Izetbegović did not accept this proposal.

Over time, Abdić's position became increasingly precarious. The only notable military success was achieved by the Western Bosnian 6th Brigade, which managed to disengage from the 5th Corps west of Pećigrad. The brigade subsequently retreated into the territory of the Republic of Serbian Krajina, knowing that the 5th Corps would not pursue them there. However, this withdrawal contributed to a humanitarian crisis, as approximately 7,000 refugees accompanied the retreating forces, exacerbating already difficult conditions in Velika Kladuša. Consequently, around 50,000 civilians from Velika Kladuša sought refuge in the Republic of Serbian Krajina.

On 12 August 1995, Paul Joachim von Stülpnagel, head of the European Union Monitoring Mission in Yugoslavia, travelled to Velika Kladuša to meet with Abdić. During the meeting, von Stülpnagel formed the impression that Abdić was not fully aware of the extent of the ongoing crisis. Shortly afterwards, Abdić held a telephone conference with international press representatives at a hotel in Zagreb. In an unexpected announcement, he proposed an interim solution for the Bihać pocket, suggesting a demilitarised zone under European Union supervision, similar to the arrangement in Mostar. According to historian Brendan O'Shea, this proposal was likely suggested to Abdić by von Stülpnagel acting independently. However, the central government of Bosnia and Herzegovina, having gained a military advantage, was unwilling to consider the proposal.

During this period, the territory controlled by the Autonomous Province of Western Bosnia was reduced to approximately 50 square kilometres around Velika Kladuša. Despite being significantly outmatched militarily, Abdić remained steadfast in his demand for negotiations with the central government. On 15 August 1995, representatives of Western Bosnia and the 5th Corps held a meeting. The Western Bosnian delegation advocated a formal ceasefire as a prerequisite to political negotiations, whereas Dudaković insisted that political talks precede any cessation of hostilities. A subsequent meeting took place on 17 August 1995, during which the Western Bosnian representatives proposed the involvement of a constitutional expert to draft a political settlement. However, a scheduled meeting for 20 August 1995 did not take place.

On 20 August 1995, Abdić departed from Velika Kladuša by helicopter. The authorities of Western Bosnia organised the evacuation of civilians to the Republic of Serbian Krajina by midnight, while the remaining military personnel stayed behind to oversee the process. The mass displacement of refugees soon led to a humanitarian crisis in Krajina, which lacked the necessary resources to accommodate them. Plans to relocate refugees to Croatia became unfeasible when Croatian authorities closed their border crossings.

The 5th Corps' final assault on Velika Kladuša began at 05:30 AM on 21 August 1995. Intense street fighting followed, and by 08:30 PM, the forces of Western Bosnia had been defeated. Dudaković subsequently entered Abdić's office. In the aftermath, soldiers moved through the abandoned streets, and looting occurred until the arrival of military police restored order.

== Bibliography ==
- Felić, Bejdo (2002). Peti korpus: (1992-1995.). Sarajevo: Ljiljan. ISBN 9958-22-098-9.
- Bezruchenko, Viktor (2022). The Civil War in Bosnia and Herzegovina (1992-95): Political, Military, and Diplomatic History / Political, Social and Religious Studies of the Balkans. Vol. III. Houston: Strategic Book Publishing and Rights Company. ISBN 9781682357125.
- Bougarel, Xavier (2018). Islam and Nationhood in Bosnia-Herzegovina: Surviving Empires. London: Bloomsbury Publishing. ISBN 9781350003613.
- Fotini, Christia (2008). "Following the Money: Muslim versus Muslim in Bosnia's Civil War". Comparative Politics. 40 (4): 461–480. doi:10.5129/001041508X12911362383390. JSTOR 20434096.
- Fotini, Christia (2012). Alliance Formation in Civil Wars. Cambridge: Cambridge University Press. ISBN 9781139851756.
- Lučić, Ivica (2005). "Evolution and Condition of the Elites in Bosnia-Herzegovina – A Personal View". National Security and the Future. 3–4 (6): 151–174.
- Martins Branco, Carlos Manuel (2009). "The Muslim National Question in Bosnia. An Historical Overview and an Analytical Reappraisal". Revista Militar (2488): 567–0.
- O'Ballance, Edgar (1995). Civil War in Bosnia 1992–94. London: Palgrave Macmillan. ISBN 9781349136667.
- O'Shea, Brendan (2012). Perception and Reality in the Modern Yugoslav Conflict: Myth, Falsehood and Deceit 1991-1995. London: Routledge. ISBN 9780415650243.
- Tokača, Mirsad (2012). Bosanska knjiga mrtvih I: ljudski gubici u Bosni i Hercegovini 1991-1995. Sarajevo: Istraživačko dokumentacioni centar. ISBN 978-9958-9544-5-0.
- Sekulić, Milisav (2000). Knin je pao u Beogradu [Knin Fell in Belgrade] (in Serbian). Nidda Verlag. UDK: 3 355.45 (497.5-074) "1991/1995".
