= National Defence of the Autonomous Province of Western Bosnia =

People's Defence of Western Bosnia
- Narodna odbrana Zapadne Bosne
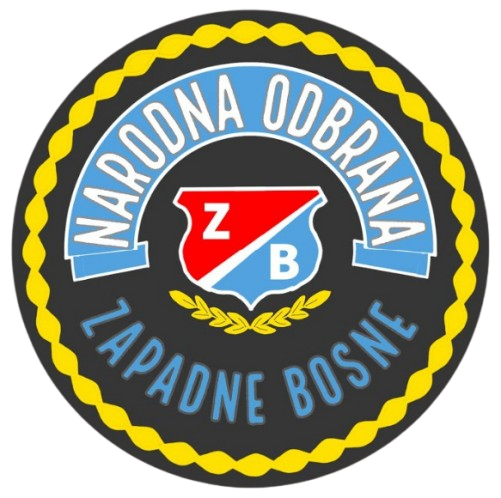
- Founded: 1993
- Disbanded: 21 August 1995
- Country: Autonomous Province of Western Bosnia
- Type: Paramilitary
- Size: 10,000 (8,000–9,000 active as infantry)
- Garrison/HQ: Velika Kladuša
- Engagements: Intra-Bosnian Muslim War; Siege of Bihać; Battle of Velika Kladuša (1993); Operation Tiger; Operation Spider; Capture of Vrnograč; Operation Sword–1; Operation Storm

Commanders
- Commander-in-Chief: Fikret Abdić
- Chief of Staff: Hasib Hodžić

The People's Defence of the Autonomous Province of Western Bosnia (Serbo-Croatian: Narodna odbrana Zapadne Bosne, NOZB) was a paramilitary unit founded and led by Fikret Abdić that fought in the Intra-Bosnian Muslim War during the Bosnian War. It served as the army of the Autonomous Province of Western Bosnia (APZB) with its headquarters located at Velika Kladuša.

== Structure ==
Structure of the People's Defense of the Autonomous Province of Western Bosnia:

- 1st Brigade NOZB
- 2nd Brigade NOZB
- 3rd Brigade NOZB
- 4th Brigade NOZB
- 5th Brigade NOZB
- 6th Brigade NOZB
- Velika Kladuša Brigade

=== Independent Special Units ===
- The Šejla unit
- The Ajkini unit
- The Metal unit
- The Golubovi unit
- The Jastrebovi unit
- The Zenge unit
- The Husko unit
- The Orlovi Pravde unit
- The "Rambo" Unit
- The Crne Pume unit
- The Sive Brade unit
- The Gutini Štakori unit
- The Modre Vidre unit
- The Labudovi unit
- The Pobjednici unit
- The Lovci unit
- The Ljuta Kobra unit
- The Kobre unit
- The Kobac unit
- The Crvene Beretke unit (company sized)
- The Special Purpose Unit
- The Otpisani unit (Platoon sized)

=== Other Units ===
- Military Police
- Border Police
- Defense Police
- Special Police Unit "Dogs"
- Anti-Terrorism Police Unit
- Anti-Sabotage Police Unit
- 343
- Logistics Base
- Medical Unit of 2nd brigade
- Technical Service of 1st brigade
- Artillery Regiment Orlovi MAD
- Tank Company
- Recruitment Center "Surovi"

== Engagements ==
=== Intra-Bosnian Muslim War ===
==== Siege of Bihać ====
From October 12th 1993 to 5 August 1995, the NOZB fought against the 5th Corps and Croatian forces with support from Republika Srpska and the Republic of Serbian Krajina. The Research and Documentation Center in Sarajevo established that the communities that were under siege – Bihać, Bosanska Krupa, Cazin and Velika Kladuša – 4,856 people were killed or went missing from 1991 to 1995. The APZB was wiped out completely during the Operation Storm, decisive Croatian offensive in Republic of Croatia, and supported by ARBIH 5th corps in area of Bihać on 4th to 7th of August 1995.

==== Operation Tiger 1994 ====
On 2 June 1994, the 5th Corps, under the command of Atif Dudaković, overran and seized the territory of Western Bosnia and Fikret Abdić fled to Zagreb for safety. Around 40,000 Muslims loyal to Fikret Abdić fled to neighbouring Croatia. The battle was a huge success for the ARBiH, which was able to rout Abdić's forces and managed to lift the siege by the Serb forces on Bihać and abolish Western Bosnia temporarily.

==== Operation Spider ====
On 4 November 1994, commanded by Franko Simatović and Jovica Stanišić, the Serbs counterattacked against the Bosniak forces, and ended in a Serb victory with the APZB being re-established. The APZB remained in existence until the fall of its key ally, the Republic of Serbian Krajina, and the subsequent end of the war.

== Legacy ==
In 2013, the Constitutional Court of Bosnia and Herzegovina issued a decision that equated the rights of former soldiers of the NOZB with those of the members of the ARBiH and the HVO.

== See also ==
- Territorial Defense (Yugoslavia)
- Territorial Defence Force of the Republic of Bosnia and Herzegovina
- Slovenian Territorial Defence
