= Bugar =

Bugar Бугар
- Village
- Location within Bosnia and Herzegovina
- Coordinates: 44°49′30″N 15°44′00″E
- Country: Bosnia and Herzegovina
- Entity: Federation of Bosnia and Herzegovina
- Canton: Una-Sana
- Municipality: Bihać

Area
  - Total: 7.87 sq mi (20.39 km^{2})

Population (2013)
  - Total: 39
  - Density: 5.0/sq mi (1.9/km^{2})
- Time zone: UTC+1 (CET)
  - Summer (DST): UTC+2 (CEST)

Bugar (Serbian Cyrillic: Бугар) is a village in the municipality of Bihać, Bosnia and Herzegovina. It is the westernmost point of the country.

== Demographics ==
According to the 2013 census, its population was 39.

Ethnicity in 2013
Ethnicity	Number	Percentage
Bosniaks	34	87.2%
Croats	2	5.1%
other/undeclared	3	7.7%
Total	39	100%
