= Donja Vidovska =

- Village
- Location within Bosnia and Herzegovina
- Coordinates: 45.129723°N 15.813394°E
- Country: Bosnia and Herzegovina
- Entity: Federation of Bosnia and Herzegovina
- Canton: Una-Sana
- Municipality: Velika Kladuša

Area
  - Total: 2.00 sq mi (5.17 km^{2})

Population (2013)
  - Total: 471
  - Density: 236/sq mi (91.1/km^{2})
- Time zone: UTC+1 (CET)
  - Summer (DST): UTC+2 (CEST)

Donja Vidovska is a village in the municipality of Velika Kladuša, Bosnia and Herzegovina. The village is some 45 kilometres north of Bihać, the closest large urban settlement, and approximately 2 kilometres west and 10 kilometres south of border with Croatia.

== Demographics ==
According to the 2013 census, its population was 471.

Ethnicity in 2013
Ethnicity	Number	Percentage
Bosniaks	375	79.6%
Croats	20	4.2%
Serbs	1	0.2%
other/undeclared	75	15.9%
Total	471	100%
