= Šturlić =

- Village
- Location within Bosnia and Herzegovina
- Coordinates: 45°03′50″N 15°46′41″E
- Country: Bosnia and Herzegovina
- Entity: Federation of Bosnia and Herzegovina
- Canton: Una-Sana
- Municipality: Cazin

Area
  - Total: 5.78 sq mi (14.98 km^{2})

Population (2013)
  - Total: 2,447
  - Density: 423.1/sq mi (163.4/km^{2})
- Time zone: UTC+1 (CET)
  - Summer (DST): UTC+2 (CEST)

Šturlić (Serbian: Штурлић) is a village in the municipality of Cazin, Bosnia and Herzegovina.

== Demographics ==
According to the 2013 census, its population was 2,447.

Ethnicity in 2013
Ethnicity	Number	Percentage
Bosniaks	2,395	97.9%
other/undeclared	52	2.1%
Total	2,447	100%
