= Operation Triangle I =

Military operation in Bosnia

Operation Triangle One
- Part of the Bosnian War
Date	3–10 July 1995
Location	Ivanjska–Glodna–Ćorkovača Mountain and Cojluk, near Bosanska Krupa, Bosnia and Herzegovina
Result	ARBiH victory
Territorial changes	ARBiH captures VRS/SVK-held territory north of the Una River

Belligerents
Republic of Bosnia and Herzegovina	Republika Srpska; Republic of Serbian Krajina

Commanders and leaders
Izet Nanić; Safet Isaković	Unknown

Units involved
Army of the Republic of Bosnia and Herzegovina; 5th Corps; 502nd Mountain Brigade; 505th Bužim Brigade; IDV "Gazije"; IDV "Hamza"; 510th Liberation Brigade; 511th Mountain Brigade	Army of Republika Srpska; 1st Krajina Corps; 1st Novigrad Infantry Brigade; 2nd Krajina Corps; 11th Krupa Brigade; Serbian Army of Krajina; 39th Banija Corps; 33rd Dvor Infantry Brigade

Casualties and losses
Unknown	Unknown

Operation Triangle I (Bosnian: Operacija Trokut I) was a military offensive conducted by the Army of the Republic of Bosnia and Herzegovina (ARBiH) in early July 1995, during the final months of the Bosnian War. The offensive was launched by the ARBiH 5th Corps in northwestern Bosnia, targeting Serb-held positions near Bosanska Otoka and Bosanska Krupa.

== Background ==
By mid-1995, the ARBiH 5th Corps was isolated in the so-called Bihać pocket, resisting pressure from both the Army of Republika Srpska (VRS) and the Serbian Army of Krajina (SVK). Previous VRS/SVK offensives had failed to fully break the enclave, and the ARBiH increasingly adopted offensive postures.

Serb forces maintained control of high ground north of the Una River, including Ivanjska Hill and the Glodna–Ćorkovača ridge. These positions threatened supply routes to Bosanska Otoka and limited ARBiH maneuverability.

== The Offensive ==
Operation Trokut I began on 3 July 1995. The 5th Corps deployed four mountain brigades (502nd, 505th, 510th, 511th), as well as special units IDV "Gazije" and "Hamza". The initial objective was to seize Glodna Hill and adjacent heights. According to the Vlada USK document, command from ARBiH headquarters directed all units in the zone to carry out offensive combat operations to tie down the enemy and prevent troop redeployment to Sarajevo.

On the first day, the 505th Brigade executed a successful surprise attack, inflicting significant losses on VRS/SVK forces and seizing equipment. The 502nd and 511th Brigades advanced and exploited gains, partially reaching the state border at the Glodna river region.

According to witness testimony to the BiH court, forces operated in the Ćorkovača region aiming to connect units and press the enemy, with involvement of special battalion “Hamza”.

The offensive culminated around 10 July, with the 511th Brigade storming the Cojluk area, eliminating the last VRS positions north of the Una. The ARBiH thus secured strategic terrain for the first time in years.

== Aftermath ==
Trokut I established a firm ARBiH presence on the Una River’s northern banks, allowing improved defensive posture around Bosanska Otoka and Bosanska Krupa. Though VRS/SVK eventually regrouped, they could not regain lost ground. This success set the stage for later operations, notably Operation Sana in August 1995.

== See also ==
- 5th Corps (Army of the Republic of Bosnia and Herzegovina)
- Bosnian War
- Operation Sana
- Army of Republika Srpska
