= Hasib Hodžić =

Bosnian politician

Hasib Hodžić (born 1945) is a former Western Bosnian chief of staff of the National Defence and chief of police.

Hodžić married a Serb woman. During the first democratic elections in the Socialist Republic of Bosnia and Herzegovina held in 1990, Hodžić was the president of the municipal organisation of the League of Communists in Velika Kladuša.

After the Intra-Bosnian Muslim War, Hodžić emigrated to Canada.
