= Todorovo =

- Village
- Location within Bosnia and Herzegovina
- Coordinates: 45.084702°N 15.930067°E
- Country: Bosnia and Herzegovina
- Entity: Federation of Bosnia and Herzegovina
- Canton: Una-Sana
- Municipality: Velika Kladuša

Area
  - Total: 2.76 sq mi (7.16 km^{2})

Population (2013)
  - Total: 802
  - Density: 290/sq mi (112/km^{2})
- Time zone: UTC+1 (CET)
  - Summer (DST): UTC+2 (CEST)

Todorovo is a village in the municipality of Velika Kladuša, Bosnia and Herzegovina.

== Demographics ==
According to the 2013 census, its population was 802.

Ethnicity in 2013
Ethnicity	Number	Percentage
Bosniaks	673	83.9%
Croats	3	0.4%
other/undeclared	126	15.7%
Total	802	100%
