= Elezovići =

- Village
- Location within Bosnia and Herzegovina
- Coordinates: 45.1763°N 15.9380°E
- Country: Bosnia and Herzegovina
- Entity: Federation of Bosnia and Herzegovina
- Canton: Una-Sana
- Municipality: Velika Kladuša

Area
  - Total: 1.47 sq mi (3.81 km^{2})

Population (2013)
  - Total: 504
  - Density: 343/sq mi (132/km^{2})
- Time zone: UTC+1 (CET)
  - Summer (DST): UTC+2 (CEST)

Elezovići is a village in the municipality of Velika Kladuša, Bosnia and Herzegovina.

== Demographics ==
According to the 2013 census, its population was 504.

Ethnicity in 2013
Ethnicity	Number	Percentage
Bosniaks	448	88.9%
Croats	2	0.4%
other/undeclared	54	10.7%
Total	504	100%
