= Šumatac =

- Village
- Location within Bosnia and Herzegovina
- Coordinates: 45.098462°N 15.857966°E
- Country: Bosnia and Herzegovina
- Entity: Federation of Bosnia and Herzegovina
- Canton: Una-Sana
- Municipality: Velika Kladuša

Area
  - Total: 3.68 sq mi (9.53 km^{2})

Population (2013)
  - Total: 926
  - Density: 252/sq mi (97.2/km^{2})
- Time zone: UTC+1 (CET)
  - Summer (DST): UTC+2 (CEST)

Šumatac is a village in the municipality of Velika Kladuša, Bosnia and Herzegovina.

== Demographics ==
According to the 2013 census, its population was 926.

Ethnicity in 2013
Ethnicity	Number	Percentage
Bosniaks	711	76.8%
Croats	18	1.9%
Serbs	2	0.2%
other/undeclared	195	21.1%
Total	926	100%
