= Zlatko Jušić =

Western Bosnian businessman and prime minister

Prime Minister of Western Bosnia
- In office 27 September 1993 – 21 August 1995
- President: Fikret Abdić
- Vice PM: Pilip Golić Vaso Bukarica
- Preceded by: Office established
- Succeeded by: Office abolished

Personal details
- Born: 16 October 1949 (age 76) Cazin, Bosnia and Herzegovina, Yugoslavia

Zlatko Jušić (born 10 October 1949) is a former Western Bosnian businessman and politician who served as Prime Minister of the Autonomous Province of Western Bosnia (APZB), a self-proclaimed autonomous region that later declared statehood in northwestern Bosnia during the Intra-Bosnian Muslim War (1993–1995).

== Biography ==
Zlatko Jušić was born on 10 October 1949 to father Sulejman and mother Safija, née Balić. He grew up in Cazin. He self-identifies as an ethnic Croat. Jušić served his military service in 1975 in Kruševac in Serbia.

Before the political appointment, Jušić was the CEO of Medic, a company specialised in the manufacture and sale of medical equipment, in Ćoralići near Cazin.

On 27 September 1993, the constituent assembly of the APZB elected its government, appointing Jušić as Prime Minister and Fikret Abdić as President. On 26 July 1995, Western Bosnia declared independence. Still, it collapsed shortly after a joint military offensive by the Croatian Army (HV) and the Army of the Republic of Bosnia and Herzegovina (ARBiH) during Operation Storm on 21 August 1995.

In the wake of Western Bosnia's collapse in August 1995, Jušić resided in Zagreb. After the war, he settled in Rijeka, Croatia. In 2007, he was arrested and charged with war crimes against civilians, but was acquitted in 2009.

== Bibliography ==
=== Books ===
- Bricault, Giselle; Murphy, Pauline; Murphy, Jennifer; Daniel, Janine, eds. (1993). Major Business Organisations of Eastern Europe and the Commonwealth of Independent States 1993/94: Albania, Baltic Republics, Bulgaria, Commonwealth of Independent States, Czech Republic, Hungary, Poland, Romania, Slovakia, Yugoslavia. London: Graham & Trotman. ISBN 9789401114509.
- Muslimović, Fikret (2000). "Sadržaj genocidne agresije prema prostoru Bosanske Krajine 1991.-1995." [The content of the genocidal aggression on the territory of Bosanska Krajna 1995-1995]. Zločini u Bosanskoj Krajini za vrijeme agresije na Repubiku Bosnu i Hecegovinu 1991-1995. - Zbornik radova sa Međunarodne naučne konferencije, održane u Bihaću od 22-24. septembra 2000 [Crimes in Bosanska Krajina during the agression on the Republic of Bosnia and Herzegovina 1991 - 1995 - Proceedings of the International Scientific Conference, held in Bihać from 22 to 24 September 2000] (in Bosnian). Bihać: Univerzitet u Sarajevu, Institut za istraživanje zločina protiv čovječnosti i međunarodnog prava. ISBN 9789958740688.
- O'Ballance, Edgar (1995). Civil War in Bosnia 1992–94. London: Palgrave Macmillan. ISBN 9781349136667.
- O'Shea, Brendan (2012). Perception and Reality in the Modern Yugoslav Conflict: Myth, Falsehood and Deceit 1991-1995. London: Routledge. ISBN 9780415650243.
- Radan, Peter (2002). The break-up of Yugoslavia and international law. London: Routledge. ISBN 9780415253529.

=== Newspapers ===
- Cvok, Vilim; Klapac, Alen (7 April 2015). "Bili smo nevini u zatvoru, Hrvatska nam to mora platiti" [We were in prison innocent and Croatia needs to pay for it]. Express (in Croatian). Zagreb.
- Opačak-Klobučar, Tamara (25 March 2009). "Zet Fikreta Abdića osuđen na 7 godina zatvora" [Fikret Abdić's son-in-law sentenced to 7 years in prison]. Večernji list (in Croatian). Zagreb.

=== Websites ===
- "Optužnica" [Charge] (PDF). Centar za mir (in Croatian). Zagreb. 2008.
