= Ćoralići =

- Village
- Location within Bosnia and Herzegovina
- Coordinates: 45°03′08″N 15°47′58″E
- Country: Bosnia and Herzegovina
- Entity: Federation of Bosnia and Herzegovina
- Canton: Una-Sana
- Municipality: Cazin

Area
  - Total: 3.27 sq mi (8.47 km^{2})

Population (2013)
  - Total: 2,665
  - Density: 815/sq mi (315/km^{2})
- Time zone: UTC+1 (CET)
  - Summer (DST): UTC+2 (CEST)

Ćoralići (Serbian: Ћоралићи) is a village in the municipality of Cazin, Bosnia and Herzegovina.

== Demographics ==
According to the 2013 census, its population was 2,665.

Ethnicity in 2013
Ethnicity	Number	Percentage
Bosniaks	2,516	94.4%
Croats	11	0.4%
Serbs	5	0.2%
other/undeclared	133	5.0%
Total	2,665	100%
