= Xavier Bougarel =

French historian and researcher

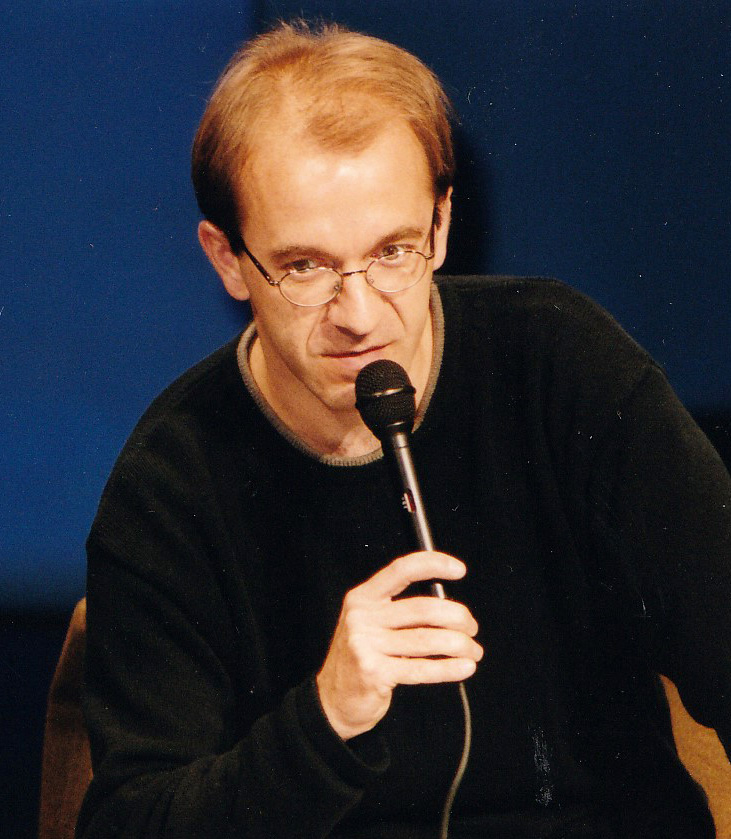
Xavier Bougarel in 2002

Xavier Bougarel is a French historian and a researcher at the Centre for Turkish, Ottoman, Balkan and Central Asian Studies of the School for Advanced Studies in the Social Sciences in Paris and an associate of the Centre Marc Bloch in Berlin.

After studying German language and culture at the University of Bordeaux III and the Free University of Berlin, he enrolled at the Paris Institute of Political Studies, where he graduated in 1990. He taught French at the University of Belgrade from 1990 to 1992 and was an associate of the Centre for International Studies and Research in Paris and Centre Marc Bloch in Berlin from 1993 to 1996. He defended his doctoral thesis in 1999, in which he discussed the relationship between Islam and politics during the war in Bosnia and Herzegovina. In the same year, he became a researcher at the Centre for Turkish, Ottoman, Balkan and Central Asian Studies of the School for Advanced Studies in the Social Sciences in Paris. Since September 2013, he has also been working at the March Bloch Centre.

His work is largely focused on the themes of Islam in Southeast Europe, with an emphasis on the relationship between religious and national identity, the relations of Bosnian Muslims with the rest of the Muslim world, and the diversity and individualization of beliefs and religious practices; the war and post-war area of the former Yugoslavia, with a special interest in the evolution of inter-communal relations during and after the war, the mobilization of militias and the mafia economy associated with them and veterans as a social group created from the war; and 13th Waffen SS Handschar division and their activities in the Second World War in South-Eastern Europe and the general status of Muslim fighters in European armed formations during the 20th century.

== Selected publications ==
- Bougarel, Xavier (2017). Islam and Nationhood in Bosnia-Herzegovina: Surviving Empires. Bloomsbury Academic. ISBN 9781350003590.
- Bougarel, Xavier; Clayer, Nathalie (2017). Europe's Balkan Muslims: A New History. C. Hurst & Co. ISBN 9781849046596.
