= Bosanska Bojna =

Village in Velika Kladuša, Bosnia and Herzegovina

- Village
- Location within Bosnia and Herzegovina
- Coordinates: 45°11′54″N 16°01′10″E
- Country: Bosnia and Herzegovina
- Entity: Federation of Bosnia and Herzegovina
- Canton: Una-Sana
- Municipality: Velika Kladuša

Area
  - Total: 4.19 sq mi (10.85 km^{2})

Population (2013)
  - Total: 61
  - Density: 15/sq mi (5.6/km^{2})
- Time zone: UTC+1 (CET)
  - Summer (DST): UTC+2 (CEST)

Bosanska Bojna is a village in Bosnia and Herzegovina.

On 5 October 2014 it was reported that the Bosniak Islamist Bilal Bosnić had acquired several houses in the village. Bosnić is currently under arrest as part of the anti-terrorist operation Akcija Damask, intended to prevent recruitment for jihadist groups and spreading of Islamic extremism in Bosnia and Herzegovina.

== Demographics ==
According to the 2013 census, its population was 61.

Ethnicity in 2013
Ethnicity	Number	Percentage
Serbs	45	73.8%
Bosniaks	8	13.1%
other/undeclared	8	13.1%
Total	61	100%
