= Johovica, Velika Kladuša =

Johovica Јоховица
- Village
- Location within Bosnia and Herzegovina
- Coordinates: 45.091291°N 15.791125°E
- Country: Bosnia and Herzegovina
- Entity: Federation of Bosnia and Herzegovina
- Canton: Una-Sana
- Municipality: Velika Kladuša

Area
  - Total: 2.84 sq mi (7.35 km^{2})

Population (2013)
  - Total: 515
  - Density: 181/sq mi (70.1/km^{2})
- Time zone: UTC+1 (CET)
  - Summer (DST): UTC+2 (CEST)

Johovica is a village in the municipality of Velika Kladuša, Bosnia and Herzegovina.

== Demographics ==
According to the 2013 census, its population was 515.

Ethnicity in 2013
Ethnicity	Number	Percentage
Bosniaks	450	87.4%
Croats	11	2.1%
other/undeclared	54	10.5%
Total	515	100%
