= Fikret Abdić =

Bosnian politician and businessman (born 1939)

Municipal Mayor of Velika Kladuša
- In office 8 November 2016 – 15 November 2024
- Preceded by: Edin Behrić
- Succeeded by: Boris Horvat

President of the Autonomous Province of Western Bosnia
- In office 27 September 1993 – 21 August 1995
- Prime Minister: Zlatko Jušić
- Preceded by: Office established
- Succeeded by: Office abolished

Muslim member of the Presidency of the Republic of Bosnia and Herzegovina
- In office 20 December 1990 – 20 October 1993; Serving with Alija Izetbegović
- Preceded by: Office established
- Succeeded by: Nijaz Duraković

Personal details
- Born: 29 September 1939 (age 87) Velika Kladuša, Kingdom of Yugoslavia
- Party: SKJ (1958–1990); SDA (1990–1993); DNZ (1993–2013); LS BiH (2013–present)
- Children: 4, including Elvira
- Profession: Economist; Businessman
- Nickname: Babo

Fikret Abdić (born 29 September 1939), nicknamed "Babo", is a Bosnian politician and businessman who first rose to prominence in the 1980s for his role in turning the Velika Kladuša–based agriculture company Agrokomerc into one of the biggest conglomerates in SFR Yugoslavia. He won the popular vote in the 1990 Bosnian general election.

In the early 1990s, during the Bosnian War, Abdić declared his opposition to the official Bosnian government, and established the Autonomous Province of Western Bosnia, a small and short-lived province in the northwestern corner of Bosnia and Herzegovina composed of the town of Velika Kladuša and nearby villages.

The mini-state existed between 1993 and 1995 and was allied with the Army of Republika Srpska. In 2002, he was convicted on charges of war crimes against Bosniaks loyal to the Bosnian government by a court in Croatia and sentenced to 20 years imprisonment, which was later reduced on appeal to 15 years by the Supreme Court of Croatia.

On 9 March 2012, he was released after having served two thirds of his reduced sentence. He was imprisoned again in June 2020 on suspicion of abuse of his office as mayor. However, he still served as mayor until November 2024, when he was succeeded by Boris Horvat.

== Early life ==
Fikret Abdić was born in the village of Donja Vidovska on 29 September 1939.

=== Early career ===
After completing his studies in agronomy, Abdić, as a relatively young engineer, became the director of the Agricultural Cooperative (Agrokomerc) in Velika Kladuša. By raising the small agricultural cooperative into a modern food combine which employed over 13,000 workers, the economy of the entire area was boosted and living standards improved, in a region previously unindustrialized and undeveloped.

Local residents of Velika Kladuša reportedly called him Babo (Father). He ran the company with strong political backing from influential politician Hamdija Pozderac and his brother, Hakija, utilizing combined socialist and capitalist methods.

In late 1987, just before the death of Hamdija Pozderac, Raif Dizdarević was about to take over the annual Presidency of Yugoslavia, during which a scandal arose. Abdić found himself prosecuted for "counter-revolutionary acts endangering the social order of the SFRY " under Article 114 of the Criminal Code of the SFRY and eventually imprisoned for alleged financial improprieties and Hamdija Pozderac resigned. The scandal shook not only the Socialist Republic of Bosnia and Herzegovina, but the whole of Yugoslavia. Another of his controversial moves was erecting a monument to an Ottoman Bosnian başbölükbaşı, Mujo Hrnjica, on a hill above Velika Kladuša.

== Presidency ==
After a fight for political monopoly, the League of Communists of Yugoslavia lost the election to nationalist parties. In the Socialist Republic of Bosnia and Herzegovina, the Serbs supported the Serb Democratic Party (SDS), while the Croats supported the Croatian Democratic Union (HDZ). Bosnian Muslims gathered around the Party of Democratic Action (SDA) led by Alija Izetbegović, a former convict and a member of the Young Muslims, who was a major defendant during the 1983 Sarajevo Process. Abdić, a former member of the League of Communists, joined the SDA as one of its leaders. In the 1990 election for the Presidency of the Socialist Republic of Bosnia and Herzegovina, Abdić won 200,000 votes more than Izetbegović. He and Izetbegović were both elected as representatives of the Muslims in the Presidency, while Ejup Ganić, also a member of the SDA, was elected to the Presidency as a representative for the minorities. Abdić thus emerged as a main threat to Izetbegović's dominance over the SDA and a potential President of the Presidency. The Abdić's line overtaking the SDA also became a possibility. However, Abdić retreated after being isolated by the leaders of the SDA and agreed to be just a Presidency member after opposition from the SDA's hardliners.

According to NIN, Abdić briefly appeared in Sarajevo when the Bosnian War broke out, hoping to assume the presidency after Izetbegović had been arrested by the Yugoslav People's Army (JNA). However, he was preempted by Izetbegović having already named Ejup Ganić for that position.

Abdić believed that Izetbegović aspired to create a unitary state based on Bosnian Muslim supremacy. As a member of the Presidency, but also of the SDA, he protested against the arbitrariness of Izetbegović and people who were above all loyal to Izetbegović. Escalating tensions led to a dire situation with no apparent solution. Abdić, departing Sarajevo in August 1992, witnessed the war's toll on both the people and the government. Amidst conflicts between Croats and Muslims in 1993, Abdić advocated strongly for negotiations as the only viable alternative to cease the bloodshed, stressing the responsibility to create a negotiation-friendly atmosphere. His emphasis on peace through negotiation highlighted a growing conflict between him and Izetbegović, signalling their differing approaches to resolving the crisis.

Lord Owen, an English diplomat and co-author of the Vance-Owen and Owen-Stoltenberg peace plans described Abdić as "forthright, confident and different from the Sarajevan Muslims. He was in favour of negotiating and compromising with Croats and Serbs to achieve a settlement, and scathing about those Muslims who wanted to block any such settlement."

== Inter-Bosnian Muslim War ==
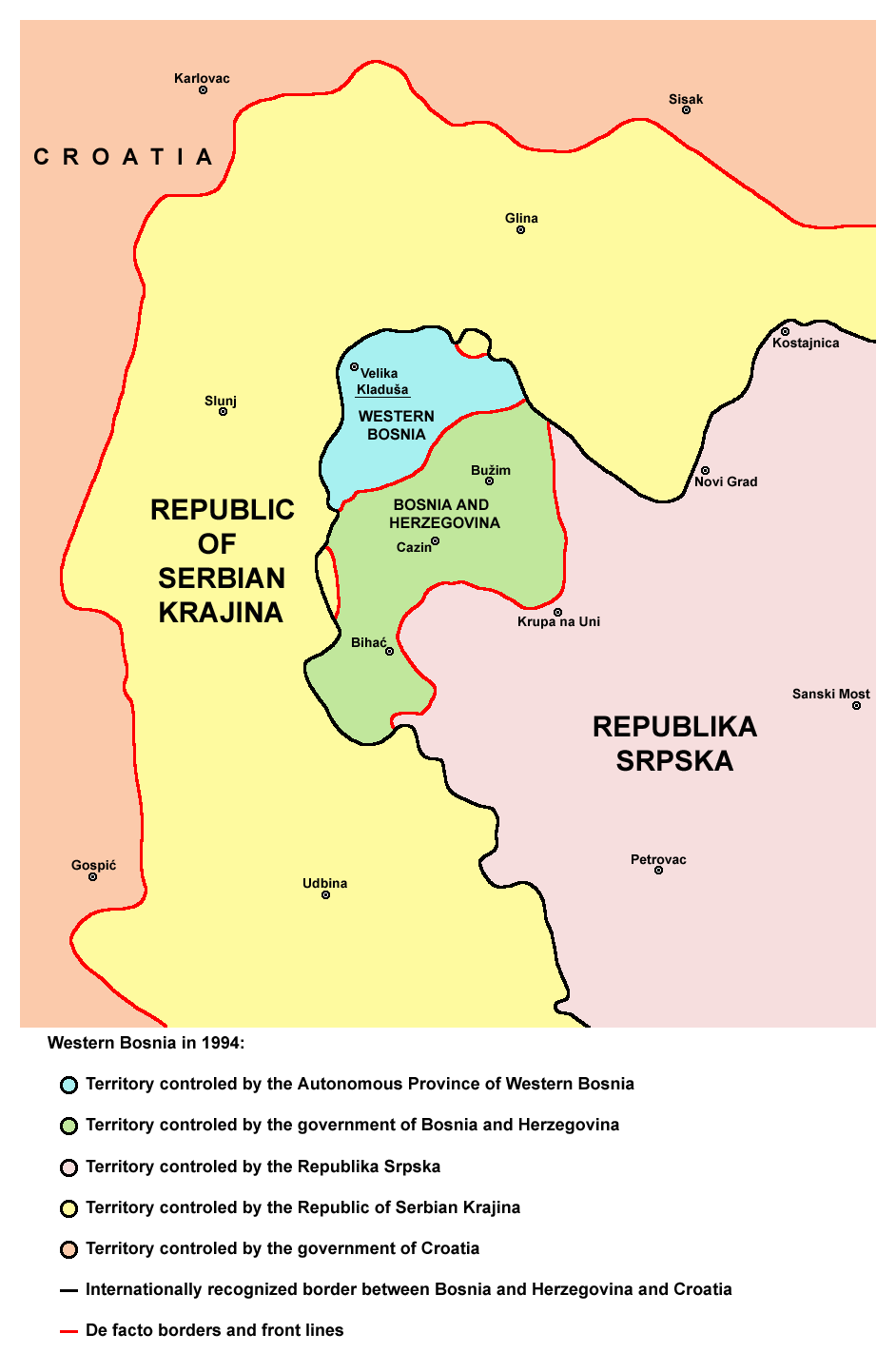
Western Bosnia in 1994

Using his expansive network of business connections, Abdić was able to keep the city supplied with consumer goods such as cigarettes, coffee, and detergent, even as it was under siege by Serb forces. Abdić enjoyed strong local support.

In the spring of 1992, the Bihać pocket, spanning 15,500 square kilometres, was surrounded by hostile forces on all sides – the Republic of Serb Krajina to the west and north (separated from Croatian territory), and the Bosnian Serb Republika Srpska to the south and east. The 5th Corps of the Army of the Republic of Bosnia and Herzegovina (ARBiH) located there lacked proper weaponry and couldn't protect Bihać if attacked. In February 1993, a French battalion from the United Nations Protection Force (UNPROFOR) arrived, but its authority and capabilities were restricted.

Abdić declared the Autonomous Province of Western Bosnia on 27 September 1993 in Velika Kladuša. The AP Western Bosnia operated as a mini-state, with a prime minister and a parliament. The Bosnian Muslims from Bihać opposed the autonomy and took the Sarajevo line. On 21 October 1993 Abdić signed a joint statement with Mate Boban, the president of the Croatian Republic of Herzeg-Bosnia in Zagreb. The next day Abdić and Radovan Karadžić, the president of Republika Srpska, signed a declaration by which both sides committed to peace. He considered that by signing these agreements he protected the population in Western Bosnia from unnecessary bloodshed. The 521st and 527th brigades of the 5th Corps of the Army of the Republic of Bosnia and Herzegovina from Velika Kladuša defected and joined Abdić.

Abdić established prison camps for those who fought for the Bosnian government. Detainees at the camps were subjected to killings, torture, sexual assaults, beatings and other cruel treatment. In addition to Abdić's paramilitary forces, a paramilitary unit from Serbia known as the Scorpions participated in the war crimes on Bosniaks. The signing of the Washington Agreement in March 1994, which ended the Croat-Bosniak War, weakened Abdić's position.

During Operation Tiger '94, the 5th Corps of Army of Republic of Bosnia and Herzegovina (ARBiH), based in the south part of the Bihać pocket in western Bosnia, militarily defeated Western Bosnia. Abdić, however, raised an army which was supplied, trained, financed by (and fought alongside) the Army of Republika Srpska (VRS) and used Serbian counterintelligence against the ARBiH and Bosniaks loyal to Izetbegović and was able to successfully reinstate Western Bosnia during Operation Spider. The Serbs took advantage of the situation and strengthened their and Abdić's positions.

On 1 August 1995, Abdić declared the AP Western Bosnia a republic, which existed only for seven days, until 7 August 1995. The Republic of Western Bosnia collapsed after it was jointly seized by the ARBiH and the Croatian Army (HV) during the Operation Storm that started in August 1995. After collapse of Western Bosnia, Abdić fled to Croatia.

== After the war ==
After the war he was granted political asylum and citizenship by the Croatian President Franjo Tuđman, and lived near Rijeka. The government of Bosnia and Herzegovina charged him with the deaths of 121 civilians, three POWs and the wounding of 400 civilians at Bihać. Croatia refused, however, to extradite him. After Tuđman's death in 1999, and the change in government in Croatia the following year, Croatian authorities arrested and tried him. In 2002, he was sentenced to 20 years in prison for war crimes committed in the area of the "Bihać pocket". In 2005, the Croatian Supreme Court reduced the sentence to 15 years. He was released from prison on 8 March 2012, after serving ten of his 15-years sentence, from the minimum security prison in Pula, whereupon he was greeted by thousands of joyful supporters who had been bused in from Velika Kladuša.

Abdić ran for the position of Bosniak member of the Bosnian presidency in 2002 on the Democratic People's Community party ticket in 2002 and won 4.1% of the vote. Bosnian law does not bar him from running for office since his conviction is in Croatia.

Abdić was LS BiH's candidate for the mayor of Velika Kladuša in the 2016 Bosnian municipal elections. He received 9,026 votes, or 48.10%, and was elected as the new mayor. In June 2020 he was arrested by Bosnia's federal police as part of a corruption investigation which included a number of municipal officials. He was put in pre-trial detention, but was released in late October after his lawyers petitioned the court to allow him to take part in the re-election campaign for the 2020 Bosnian municipal elections in November that year, which he narrowly won with 44.1 percent of the vote. In March 2021 prosecutors formally indicted Abdić and six other municipal officials on charges of graft related to procurement tenders.

== See also ==
- Elvira Abdić-Jelenović

== Bibliography ==
- Fotini, Christia (2008). "Following the Money: Muslim versus Muslim in Bosnia's Civil War". Comparative Politics. 40 (4): 461–480. doi:10.5129/001041508X12911362383390. JSTOR 20434096.
- Lučić, Ivica (2005). "Evolution and Condition of the Elites in Bosnia-Herzegovina – A Personal View". National Security and the Future. 3–4 (6): 151–174.
- Lunić, Tomislav A. (2019). "Потенцијална могућност спречавања сукоба у бившој ЦР БиХ – случај Фикрет Абдић" [The potential possibility of preventing conflicts in the former SR BiH – the case of Fikret Abdić]. Култура полиса (in Serbian) (38): 231–243.
- Martins Branco, Carlos Manuel (2009). "The Muslim National Question in Bosnia. An Historical Overview and an Analytical Reappraisal". Revista Militar (2488): 567–0.
