= Autonomous Province of Western Bosnia =

Unrecognized proto-state in the Balkans (1993–1995)

Autonomous Province of Western Bosnia (1993–1995) Serbo-Croatian: Autonomna Pokrajina Zapadna Bosna Republic of Western Bosnia (1995) Serbo-Croatian: Republika Zapadna Bosna
- 1993–1995
- Flag Coat of arms

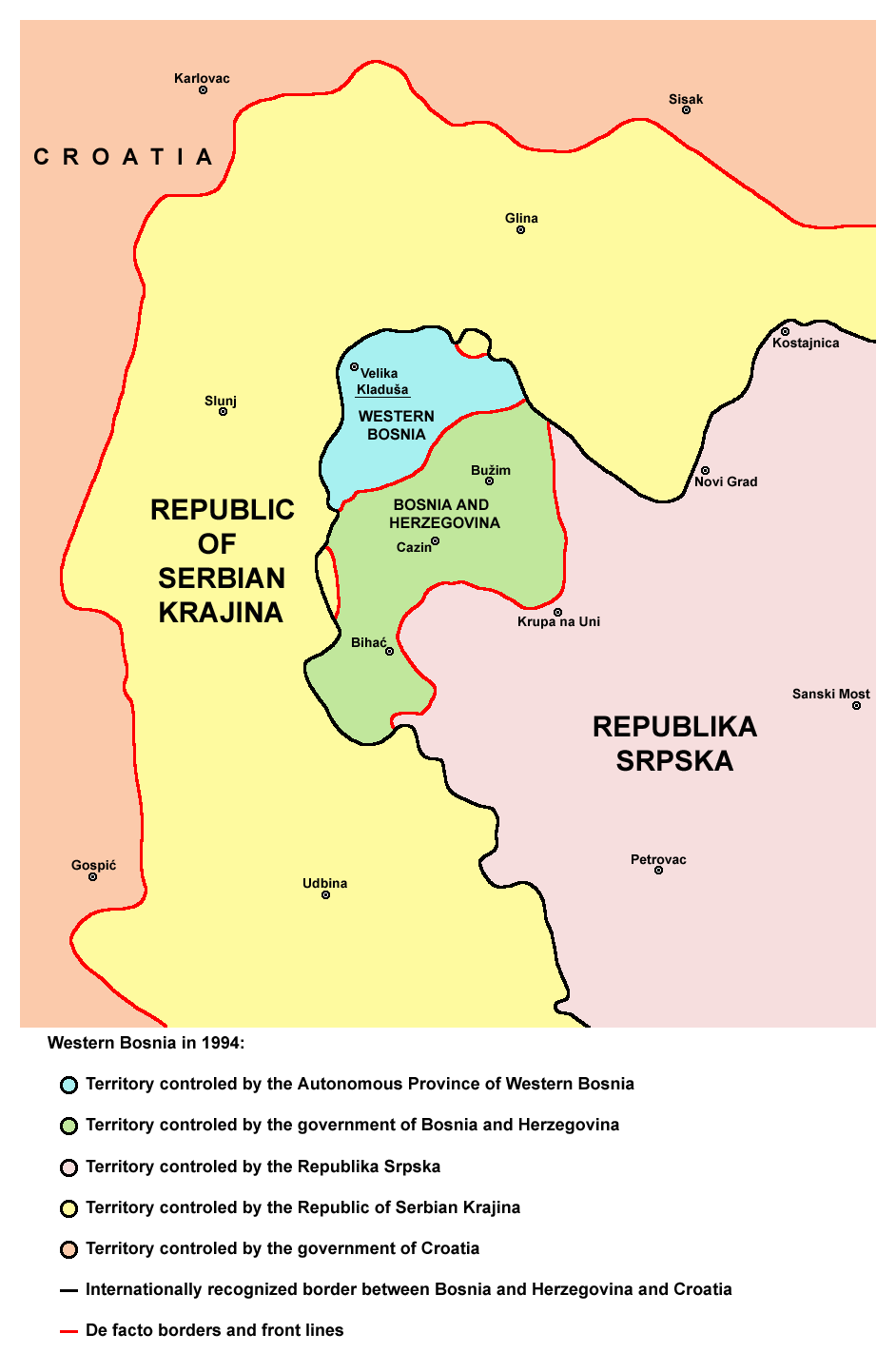
- Map showing the location of Western Bosnia (cyan) between the Republic of Serbian Krajina and Republika Srpska.
- Status: Autonomous province under a Personalist dictatorship
- Capital: Velika Kladuša; 45°11′N 15°48′E
- Common languages: Serbo-Croatian
- Demonym: Western Bosnian
- President
  - 1993–1995: Fikret Abdić (Babo)
- Speaker of the Parliament
  - 1993–1995: Božidar Šicel
- Prime Minister
  - 1993–1995: Zlatko Jušić
- Legislature: Constituent Parliament of APZB
- Historical era: Intra-Bosnian Muslim War
  - Autonomy declared: 27 September 1993
  - Washington Agreement: 18 March 1994
  - Independence declared: 26 July 1995
  - Territory conquered: 7 August 1995

Area
  - Total: 400 km^{2} (150 sq mi)

Population
  - 1991 estimate: 52,908
  - Density: 132/km^{2} (341.9/sq mi)
- Currency: Various: Deutsche Mark, U.S. dollar, French franc, pound sterling all used, possibly Yugoslav dinar as well.
Preceded by	Succeeded by
Republic of Bosnia and Herzegovina	Republic of Bosnia and Herzegovina
- Today part of: Bosnia and Herzegovina

The Autonomous Province of Western Bosnia (Serbo-Croatian: Autonomna Pokrajina Zapadna Bosna; APZB), was a small unrecognized proto-state that existed in the northwest of Bosnia and Herzegovina between 1993 and 1995. It consisted mainly of the town of Velika Kladuša, its capital, and a few nearby villages. It was proclaimed as a result of secessionist politics by Fikret Abdić against the central government of Alija Izetbegović during the Bosnian War, which led to the Intra-Bosnian Muslim War. For a short time in 1995, it was known as the Republic of Western Bosnia (Serbo-Croatian: Republika Zapadna Bosna).

== Background ==
The Cazinska Krajina region, located in the far north-western part of Bosanska Krajina, had a slightly higher GDP per capita compared to the average of the Socialist Republic of Bosnia and Herzegovina. Predominantly populated by Bosnian Muslims, the region encompasses the municipalities of Bihać, Cazin, and Velika Kladuša. To the north and west, it borders Croatia, while to the south and east, it is separated from the broader Muslim population by Serb- and Croat-majority areas.

Fikret Abdić founded the agricultural company Agrokomerc in Velika Kladuša, which, during the 1970s and 1980s, transformed Cazinska Krajina from an impoverished rural area into a prosperous regional economy. Agrokomerc became Yugoslavia's largest food-processing conglomerate, employing approximately 13,000 people and operating numerous factories and retail outlets. The company's success significantly improved the standard of living in the region, and Abdić gained a strong personal following, earning the nickname "Babo" (English: Dad).

With the transition from a one-party system, the League of Communists of Yugoslavia lost power to nationalist parties. In Bosnia and Herzegovina, Serbs aligned with the Serb Democratic Party (SDS), Croats with the Croatian Democratic Union (HDZ), while Muslims consolidated around the Party of Democratic Action (SDA), led by Alija Izetbegović. Abdić, previously a member of the League of Communists, joined the SDA and became one of its leading figures.

In Cazinska Krajina, where the SDA was initially founded by Mirsad Veladžić and Irfan Ljubijankić, two members of the pan-Islamist movement, only became a mass movement after Abdić announced his support for it in September 1990.

In the Bosnian general election held in November 1990, Abdić and Izetbegović were the SDA candidates for Muslim seats in the seven-member Presidency. Abdić won 1,040,307 votes, versus just 874,213 for Izetbegović. Both were elected as Muslim representatives in the seven-member presidency, alongside Ejup Ganić, who secured a seat as a representative of ethnic minorities. However, due to opposition from the party's hardline faction, Abdić was sidelined, and Izetbegović assumed the leading role in the government.

=== Political Struggles and the start of the Bosnian War ===
In May 1992, Izetbegović was detained by the Yugoslav People's Army (JNA) upon returning from an unsuccessful peace conference in Lisbon. Meanwhile, reports surfaced that Abdić had successfully travelled from Bihać to Sarajevo, crossing multiple frontlines without difficulty. This fuelled suspicions within the SDA leadership, particularly among Ganić and his faction, who feared Abdić was attempting to stage a coup with the backing of Belgrade and the JNA high command.

During a crisis meeting at the presidency building, Interior Minister Alija Delimustafić proposed appointing a new president more willing to negotiate with the JNA. This was firmly opposed by Ganić and the party's hardliners, who viewed any form of compromise as betrayal. Although no direct evidence linked Abdić to a coup attempt, his political influence in Sarajevo was effectively curtailed.

In September 1992, Abdić returned to Bihać and assumed an advisory role in the District Assembly. His primary objective was to keep the Bihać Pocket out of the war, as the conflict escalated across Bosnia and Herzegovina.

On 27 April 1993, Krajina Serbs launched an attack near Bosanska Bojna, capturing a significant portion of land. While initially presented as a localised offensive by displaced Serbs, further investigation revealed it was a coordinated military operation involving Serb forces from both Bosnia and Krajina. The 5th Corps repelled the attack, confirming its strategic nature.

On 6 May 1993, United Nations Security Council Resolution 842 granted the Bihać pocket the status of a "safe area". This pocket encompassed a vast territory with a predominantly Muslim population of approximately 250,000 people. It was geographically isolated, bordered by the self-proclaimed Republic of Serbian Krajina (RSK) in Croatia and Republika Srpska (RS), with a 118 km-long border with RSK. The elimination of this military stronghold was seen as a critical step towards unifying the two Serb-controlled territories.

After Bihać was designated a UN "safe area", Abdić determined that the United Nations lacked the means to enforce this status, leaving the region vulnerable. Given the 5th Corps' limited operational capacity, he concluded that negotiating with the Serbs was the best course of action. Abdić engaged in talks with Serb representatives, leading to UNPROFOR-proposed demilitarisation of the contested Bosanska Bojna area. The plan involved deploying French UN troops as a buffer, supported by UN civil police (UNCIVPOL) to maintain order. Resettlement efforts for displaced inhabitants were also proposed but deemed overly ambitious.

As the Washington Accord failed to gain traction in Sarajevo, Abdić grew increasingly concerned. He believed Izetbegović had rejected it solely because the Serbs had accepted it, exacerbating their tensions. This culminated in a heated debate at a Presidential Council meeting on 23 June 1993, where the idea of partitioning Bosnia and Herzegovina into three ethnic provinces was discussed. Abdić supported the proposal, arguing that partition was already a reality. However, Ganić vehemently opposed it, insisting that the war must continue. Izetbegović took a similarly intransigent stance, calling for a boycott of peace talks in Geneva if partition remained on the agenda. On 28 June, both Izetbegović and Ganić walked out, leaving Abdić and the remaining presidency members uncertain.

On 15 July 1993, the Erdut Agreement allowed the UN to take control of key infrastructure in Croatia, momentarily easing tensions. However, as ceasefire agreements were negotiated among Muslim, Croat, and Serb leaders, renewed violence—such as the shelling of the Maslenica Bridge—highlighted the fragile nature of peace efforts. By August, the talks collapsed entirely, and the blockade of Sarajevo by Serb forces resumed. The situation further deteriorated when Izetbegović refused further discussions with Mate Boban until humanitarian access to Muslim communities was guaranteed.

The Owen–Stoltenberg plan caused significant tensions within the Collegial Presidency, with representatives of the civic parties opposing the plan but reluctant to continue a war that was devastating Bosnian society. Izetbegović and Ganić favoured renegotiating the plan, while Abdić advocated for its immediate and unconditional acceptance. Over the summer, Abdić resigned from the Collegial Presidency to return to his stronghold in Cazinska Krajina, where he came into conflict with local SDA leaders. Similar to the Vance–Owen Plan, the Owen–Stoltenberg Plan also sparked internal conflict among Bosnian Muslims.

Amidst these broader struggles, a significant internal conflict emerged in the Bihać region. Abdić capitalised on dissatisfaction with Sarajevo's governance. On 7 September, a committee was formed in Velika Kladuša advocating for an Autonomous Province of Western Bosnia within a proposed Union of Republics of Bosnia-Herzegovina. While this initiative initially gathered substantial signatures, further assessment indicated that support was largely confined to those with ties to Abdić's Agrokomerc business network rather than the wider population.

== History ==
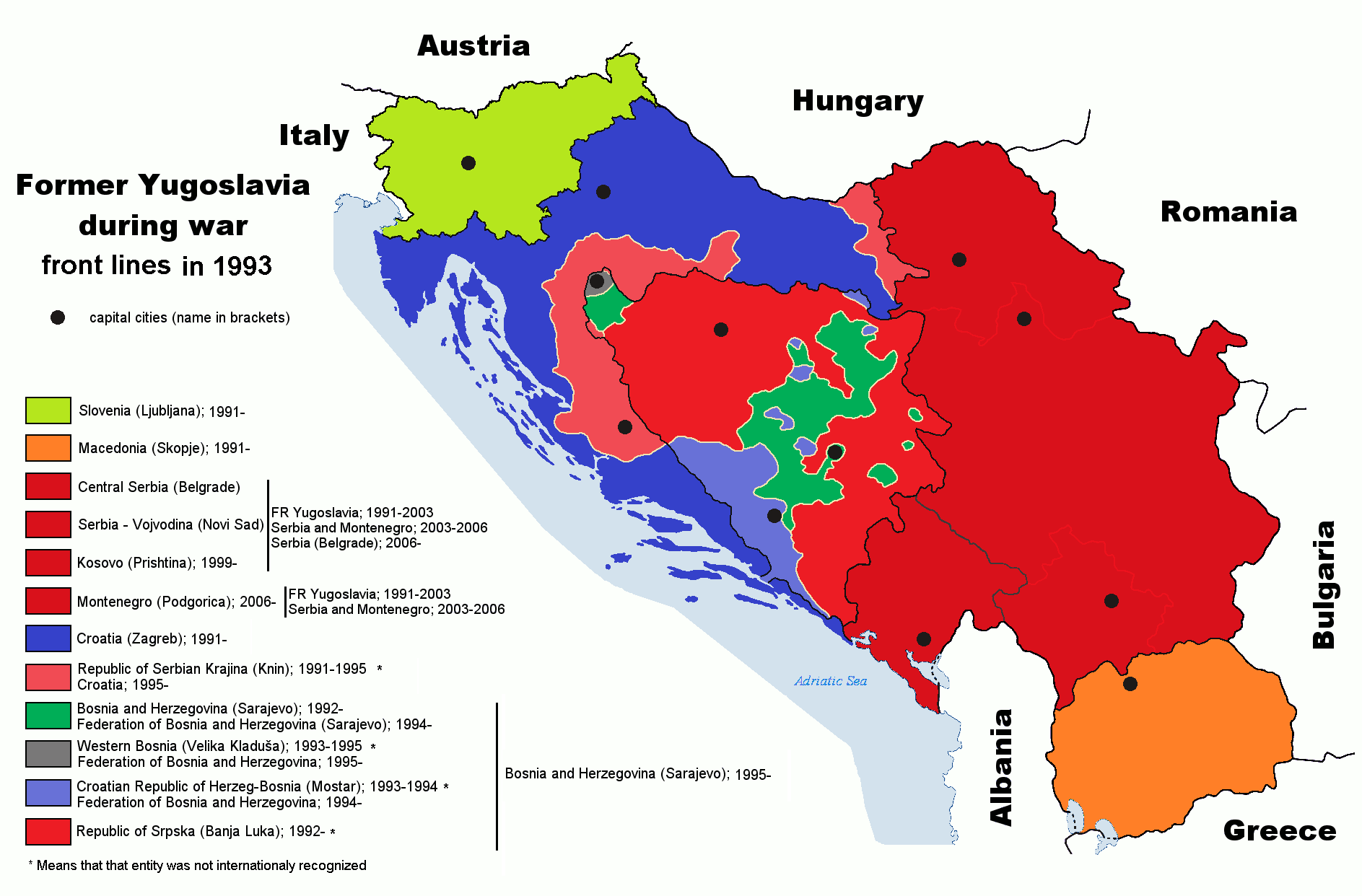
Map of Yugoslavia in 1993 that includes Western Bosnia (in grey).

On 27 September 1993, Abdić declared the Autonomous Province of Western Bosnia in Velika Kladuša. The entity operated as a self-governing mini-state with its own Prime Minister and Parliament. While Abdić's supporters backed autonomy, Bosnian Muslims from Bihać remained loyal to the Republic of Bosnia and Herzegovina, opposing the breakaway region.

Western Bosnia's supporters identified themselves as Muslims (Serbo-Croatian Latin: Muslimani), unlike those aligned with the central government, who adopted the term Bosniaks during the war. Western Bosnians accused Sarajevo-backed Muslims of religious extremism, whereas they claimed to represent a multi-ethnic movement.

Abdić secured 50,000 signatures in favour of autonomy, along with the support of 75% of local municipal council delegates. However, critics alleged that coercion by his police forces influenced the outcome. Despite these claims, he retained strong local support.

The new entity, located in the northern part of the Bihać Pocket, aligned politically and economically with Croatia, Serbia, and the Krajina Serbs. Abdić secured non-aggression pacts with Mate Boban, Radovan Karadžić, and the Krajina Serbs, effectively isolating Sarajevo's forces in the region. His influence expanded when the 521st Brigade and 527th Brigade of the 5th Corps of the Army of the Republic of Bosnia and Herzegovina (ARBiH) from Velika Kladuša defected to his side.

For the Serbs, neutralising the 5th Corps in Bihać was of strategic significance. Simultaneously, Abdić aligned with Serb interests. At the time, Slobodan Milošević entertained the idea of incorporating Western Bosnia into a hypothetical "future Yugoslavia". The Serbian State Security Service covertly provided military aid to Abdić's forces. By early 1994, Abdić's military consisted of six infantry brigades, comprising up to 10,000 men, as well as artillery units and tanks supplied by the Army of Republika Srpska (VRS).

Abdić aligned himself with opponents of the Sarajevo government. On 7 November 1993, he met with Vladimir Lukić and Jadranko Prlić, the prime ministers of Republika Srpska and the Croatian Republic of Herzeg-Bosnia, respectively. During this meeting, the three leaders reportedly agreed on a series of political and economic initiatives, reinforcing Abdić's position as a significant factor in the regional conflict.

It was militarily defeated during Operation Tiger in June and August 1994, when the Bosnian government troops seized the territory of Western Bosnia. Fikret Abdić moved to Zagreb. However, they were expelled later that year with the significant help of the Serbs in Operation Spider, and the APZB was re-established.

The province declared itself the independent Republic of Western Bosnia on 26 July 1995. In August 1995, Operation Storm made it serve as the last line of defence of the Republic of Serbian Krajina in Croatia. The RZB was wiped out completely during the joint Croatian-Bosnian government army action on 7 August 1995. Abdić was forced to flee to Croatia after the operation.

== Political system ==
A 400-member Constituent Assembly of the Autonomous Province of Western Bosnia was organised on 27 September 1993. It elected Abdić as president and the Government led by Zlatko Jušić.

The government of Western Bosnia was led by the prime minister, who had two deputies. It had six ministries and two ministers without portfolio.

Portfolio	Minister
Prime Minister	Zlatko Jušić
Vice Prime Minister	Pilip Golić
Vice Prime Minister	Vaso Bukarica
Justice	Ćazim Mehagić
Social Activities	Ismet Biščević
Defence and Police	Irfan Saračević
Foreign Affairs	Rajko Stević
Finance	Ismeta Junuzović
Judiciary	Lela Mahić
Without portfolio	Viktor Gabaldo
Without portfolio	Mehmed Nuhanović

== Armed forces ==
The defence force of the proto-state was the National Defence (Narodna Odbrana Zapadne Bosne or NOZB). It was militarily dependent of the forces of Republika Srpska and the Republic of Serbian Krajina.

== Foreign relations ==
The Autonomous Province cooperated with Serbia as well as Croatia against the Bosnian government. Abdić's role in undermining the rival authority in Sarajevo was awarded by the governments of Croatia and the Republic of Serbia inside of the Federal Republic of Yugoslavia. Agrokomerc was granted a custom-free trade zone in the Croatian port of Rijeka and free trade with Serbian-controlled territories. Trade between Western Bosnia and Croatia occurred during the Bosnian War.

In 1994, Franjo Tuđman changed his policies towards Bosnia after diplomatic pressure from the United States and the UN Security Council. The Washington Agreement was signed in March 1994. The situation became very unfavourable to the future of Western Bosnia, as Fikret Abdić could no longer count on financial or military help by one of his protectors.

== Aftermath ==
Western Bosnia's territory was incorporated into the Federation of Bosnia and Herzegovina, within the present-day Una-Sana Canton. Fikret Abdić, who maintained friendly relations with Croatian President Franjo Tuđman, had acquired Croatian citizenship and lived in Croatia in exile.

After the death of Tuđman in December 1999 and the defeat of the Croatian Democratic Union in the Croatian elections of 2000, Abdić was eventually arrested and convicted for war crimes against civilian Bosniaks loyal to the Republic of Bosnia and Herzegovina. The trial took place in Croatia, where Abdić was condemned to 20 years in prison in 2002. On 9 March 2012, he was released after he had served two thirds of his reduced sentence. In 2016, the citizens of Velika Kladuša elected Abdić mayor.

In June 2020 he was arrested by Bosnia's federal police as part of a corruption investigation which included a number of municipal officials. He was put in pre-trial detention, but was released in late October after his lawyers petitioned the court to allow him to take part in the re-election campaign for the 2020 Bosnian municipal elections in November that year, which he narrowly won with 44.1% of the vote. In March 2021 prosecutors formally indicted Abdić and six other municipal officials on charges of graft related to procurement tenders.

== Gallery ==
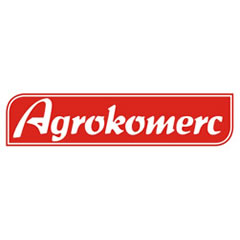
The logo of Agrokomerc, the company led by Abdić

Previously alleged flag of AP Western Bosnia from 1993 to 1995

== See also ==
- History of Bosnia and Herzegovina
- Bosnian Serb Republic
- Croatian Republic of Herzeg-Bosnia
- Republic of Serbian Krajina

== Bibliography ==
- Bezruchenko, Viktor (2022). The Civil War in Bosnia and Herzegovina (1992-95): Political, Military, and Diplomatic History / Political, Social and Religious Studies of the Balkans. Vol. III. Houston: Strategic Book Publishing and Rights Company. ISBN 9781682357125.
- Bougarel, Xavier (2018). Islam and Nationhood in Bosnia-Herzegovina: Surviving Empires. London: Bloomsbury Publishing. ISBN 9781350003613.
- Fotini, Christia (2008). "Following the Money: Muslim versus Muslim in Bosnia's Civil War". Comparative Politics. 40 (4): 461–480. doi:10.5129/001041508X12911362383390. JSTOR 20434096.
- Fotini, Christia (2012). Alliance Formation in Civil Wars. Cambridge: Cambridge University Press. ISBN 9781139851756.
- Lučić, Ivica (2005). "Evolution and Condition of the Elites in Bosnia-Herzegovina – A Personal View". National Security and the Future. 3–4 (6): 151–174.
- Martins Branco, Carlos Manuel (2009). "The Muslim National Question in Bosnia. An Historical Overview and an Analytical Reappraisal". Revista Militar (2488): 567–0.
- Muslimović, Fikret (2000). "Sadržaj genocidne agresije prema prostoru Bosanske Krajine 1991.-1995." [The content of the genocidal aggression on the territory of Bosanska Krajna 1995-1995]. Zločini u Bosanskoj Krajini za vrijeme agresije na Repubiku Bosnu i Hecegovinu 1991-1995. - Zbornik radova sa Međunarodne naučne konferencije, održane u Bihaću od 22-24. septembra 2000 [Crimes in Bosanska Krajina during the agression on the Republic of Bosnia and Herzegovina 1991 - 1995 - Proceedings of the International Scientific Conference, held in Bihać from 22 to 24 September 2000] (in Bosnian). Bihać: Univerzitet u Sarajevu, Institut za istraživanje zločina protiv čovječnosti i međunarodnog prava. ISBN 9789958740688.
- O'Ballance, Edgar (1995). Civil War in Bosnia 1992–94. London: Palgrave Macmillan. ISBN 9781349136667.
- O'Shea, Brendan (2012). Perception and Reality in the Modern Yugoslav Conflict: Myth, Falsehood and Deceit 1991-1995. London: Routledge. ISBN 9780415650243.
