= 2nd Armoured-Mechanized Battalion =

2nd Armoured-Mechanized Battalion "Pume": 2. oklopno-mehanizirana bojna "Pume"
- Active: 2007-Present
- Country: Croatia
- Branch: Croatian Army
- Role: Mechanized infantry
- Part of: Guards Armoured Mechanized Brigade
- Garrison/HQ: Varaždin
- Nicknames: Pumas; Pume
- Anniversaries: December 23rd

The 2nd Armoured-Mechanized Battalion "Pume" (Lit: Pumas) (Croatian: 1. oklopno-mehanizirana bojna "Pume") is one of two mechanized infantry battalions within the Guards Armoured Mechanized Brigade (GOMBR) of the Croatian Army.

== History ==
Established in its current form after the reorganisation of the Armed Forces of Croatia in 2007, the 2nd Mechanized Battalion "Pume" was created with the amalgamation Croatia's wartime 7th Guards Brigade "Pumas" and 2nd Guards Brigade "Thunders".

== Organisation ==
Garrisoned at 7th Guards Brigade "Puma" barracks in Varaždin, the battalion is composed of three tracked mechanized infantry companies, a command company, a logistics company and a fire support company.
