= Kuna =

Kuna may refer to:

== People ==
- Kuna (surname), a surname

== Places ==
- Kuna, Idaho, a town in the United States
  - Kuna Caves, a lava tube in Idaho
- Kuna Peak, a mountain in California
- Kuna Pelješka, a village in the Orebić municipality, Croatia
- Kuna Konavoska, a village in the Konavle municipality, Croatia
- Kuna River (Alaska), a river in Alaska North Slope
- Kuna River (basin of Kamarang), in Venezuela and Guyana
- Kuna (river, Russia, Murmansk Oblast)
- Kuna (river, Russia, Pskov Oblast)
- Kuna (river, Ukraine)
- Mera (river, Lithuania), also called Kūna

== Ships ==
- Kuna (icebreaker), the oldest river icebreaker still in service in the world

== Other uses ==
- Croatian kuna, a currency used between 1994 and 2023
- Independent State of Croatia kuna, a currency used between 1941 and 1945
- Kuna people, best known as Guna, an indigenous people of Panama
- Kuna language, a language spoken by the Guna people
- Kuna (company), a cryptocurrency exchange in Ukraine

== See also ==
- Guna (disambiguation)
- KUNA (disambiguation)
- Kune (disambiguation)
- Kuny (disambiguation)
