= Knin Fortress =

Fortress in Croatia

- Kninska tvrđava
- Knin, Croatia
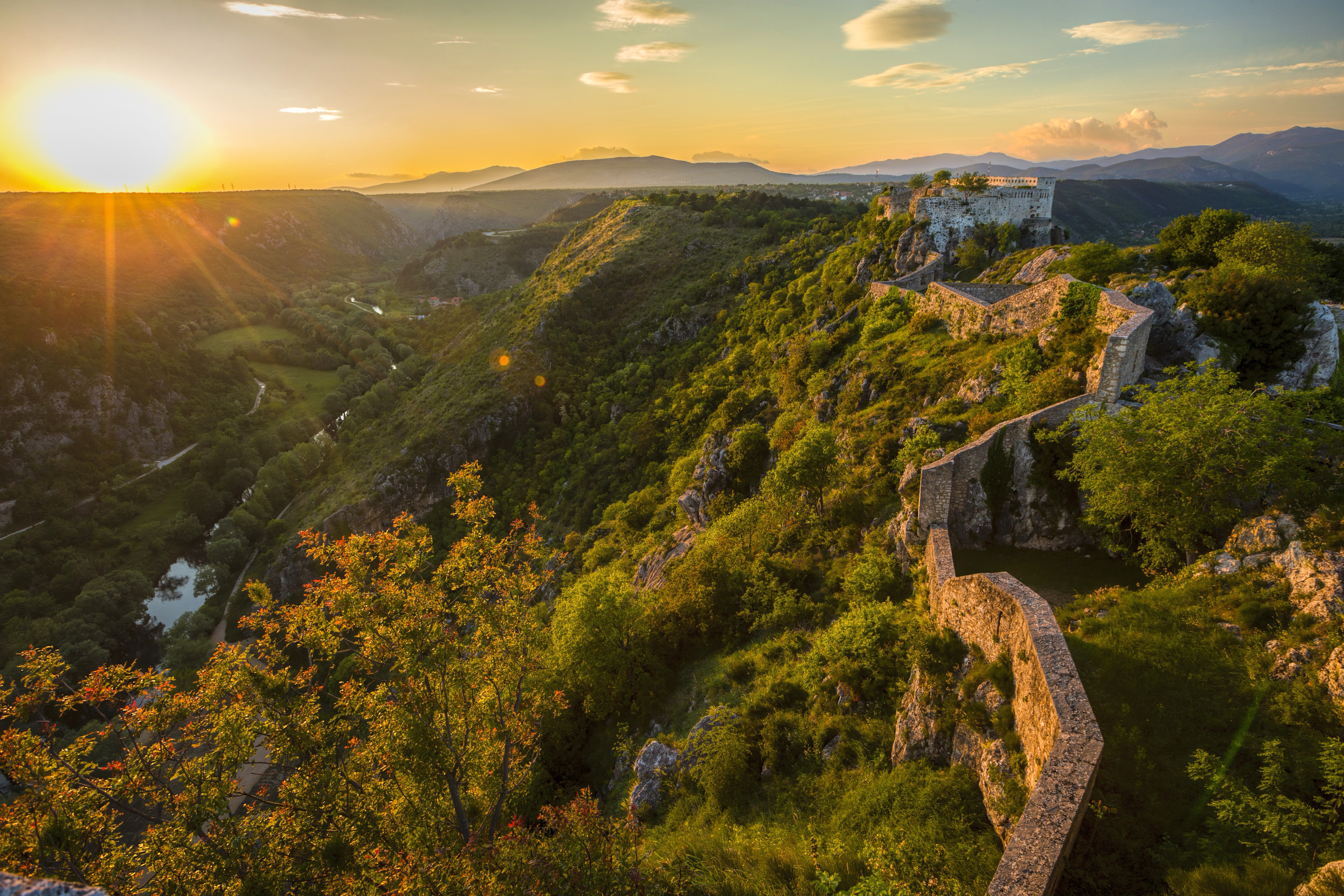
- View on the Knin Fortress

Site information
- Type: Fortification, mixed
- Open to the public: Yes
- Condition: Slightly renovated

Location
- Location within Croatia
- Coordinates: 44.034037°N 16.193494°E
- Height: ca. 20 meters

Site history
- Built: Unknown, probably in the 6th or 10th century
- Built by: Various Croat rulers, expanded mostly by: Ignacije Macanović; Orazio Antonio Alberghetti
- Materials: Limestone

Knin Fortress (Croatian: Kninska tvrđava) is located near the tallest mountain in Croatia, Dinara, and near the source of the river Krka. It is the second largest fortress in Croatia and most significant defensive stronghold, and a historical town in the Šibenik-Knin County in the Dalmatian Hinterland. The construction of the fortress started as early as 9th century, while the current state was brought up in 17th and 18th centuries. It reached its peak during the reign of Demetrius Zvonimir, King of Croatia from 1076, as it served as a political center of the Croatian Kingdom under him.

== Location and description ==
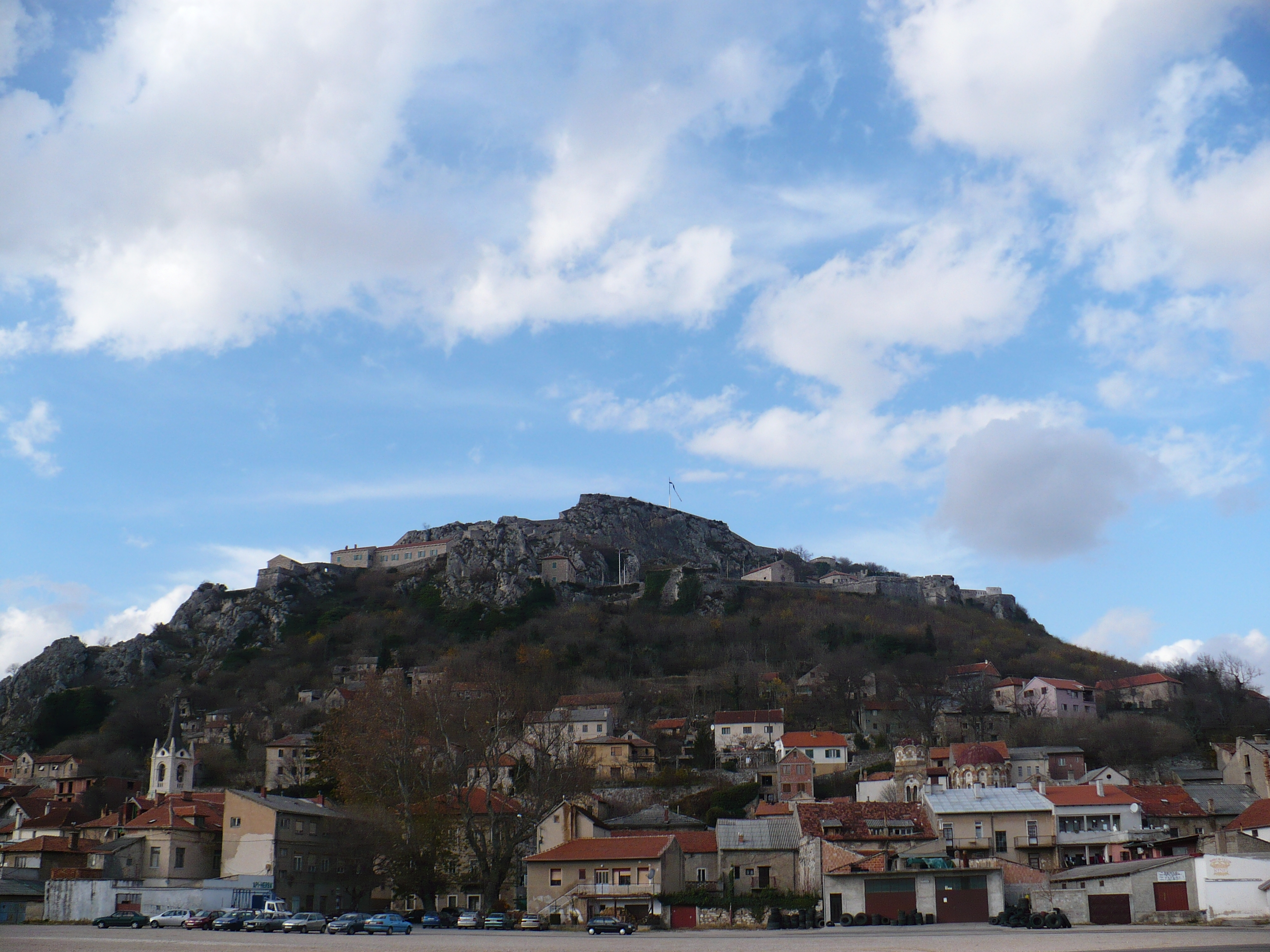
Spas mountain

It is situated on the main transport corridor leading from Dalmatia to continental Croatia and Bosnia. The Knin Fortress lies on top of the steep Spas mountain, just 100 meters (328 ft) above the Croatian town of Knin, whose historical location was formed quite early at the foothills of the same mountain. Archaeological excavations date that this area was populated since the 6th century. It is 470 metres (1,540 ft) long, and 110 meters (361 ft) wide, elevated at 345 metres (1,132 ft) above the sea. The original look of the building, because of the lack of its material, isn't completely known. According to other similar fortifications from that time, it is assumed that it was surrounded by high walls, while the construction was accommodated to the terrain; it is environmentally secured by steep slopes on some places.

The fortress comprises three parts: northern, middle and southern. Each part of the fortress is protected by loopholes and gun holes, and is connected to other parts by the city gates and drawbridges. The formation of the northern section, according to recent research, happened from the middle of the 8th century to the end of the 11th century.

Baroque stone gates are set on the main entrance to the fortress, where the doors are made out of oakwood and strengthened with iron nails. This monumental entrance was most likely constructed by Ignacije Macanović, a builder from Trogir. Above the doors, the symbol of the Venetian Republic can be seen.

Towards the northern part, on the left side, a building of the governor of arms used to be there; today it is the old city hall. Left of it were the barracks which eventually became the gallery of the museum of Knin. On the same location a memorial was elevated to fra Lujo Marun (1857–1939), a friar who was the first to instigate archaeological excavations in this area, and to discover many remains of the old Croatian culture.

Within the church of St. Barbara, a bell is kept as a gift from Pope John Paul II, which was given to Knin during his stay in 1994. The current state was undertaken by a Venetian military engineer, Alberghetti, where an inscription suggests that the construction works were completed in 1711. It is protected as a historical urban complex and is inscribed in the register of the Cultural heritage of Croatia as a monument of top importance.

The church of St. Barbara, dedicated to Cyril and Methodius, also holds an epitaph written in Old Church Slavonic:

Hodotajstvom blaženuju apostola Kirila i Metodija, Bože budi štitom Hrvatskoj.

== History ==
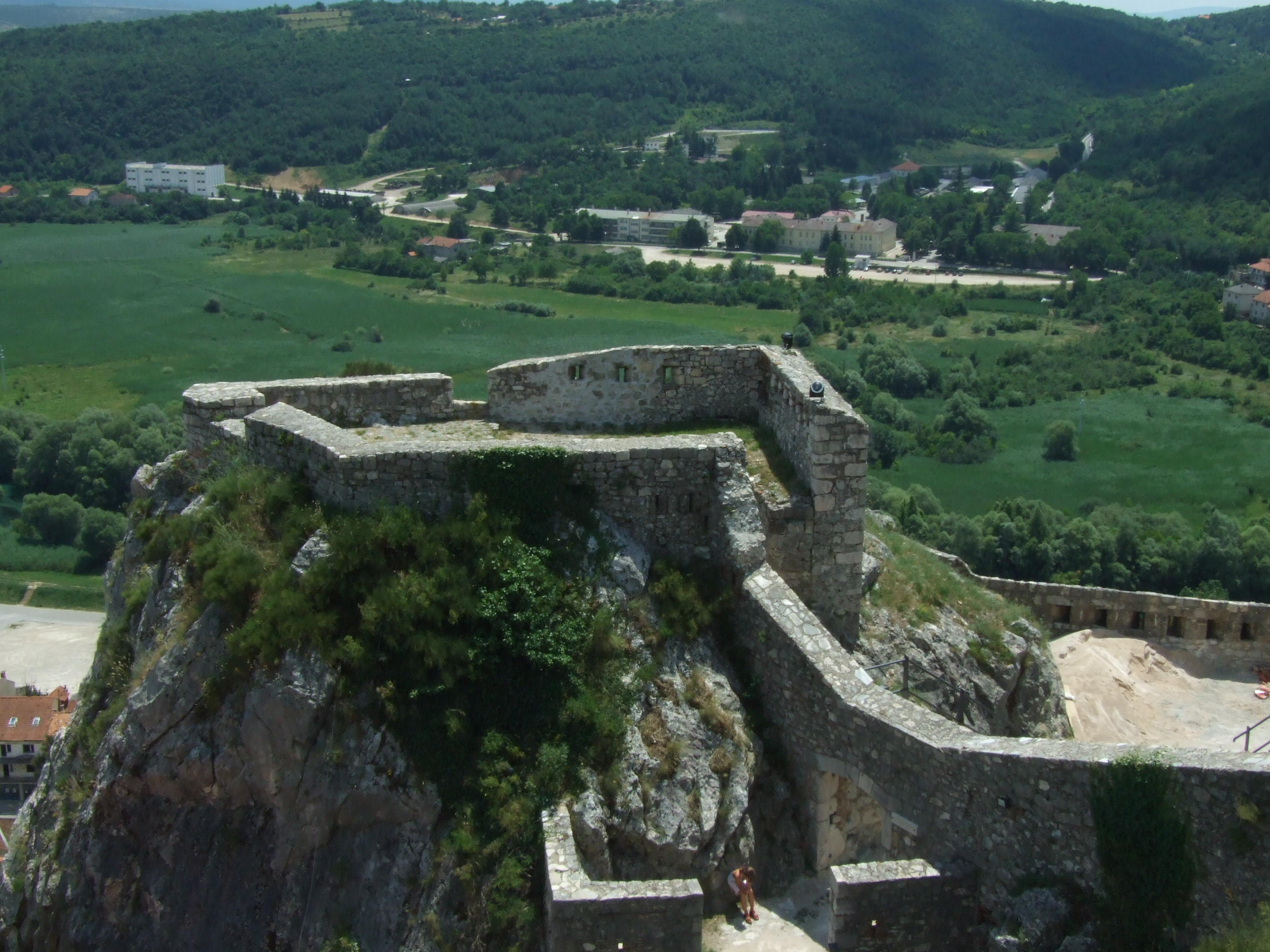
West

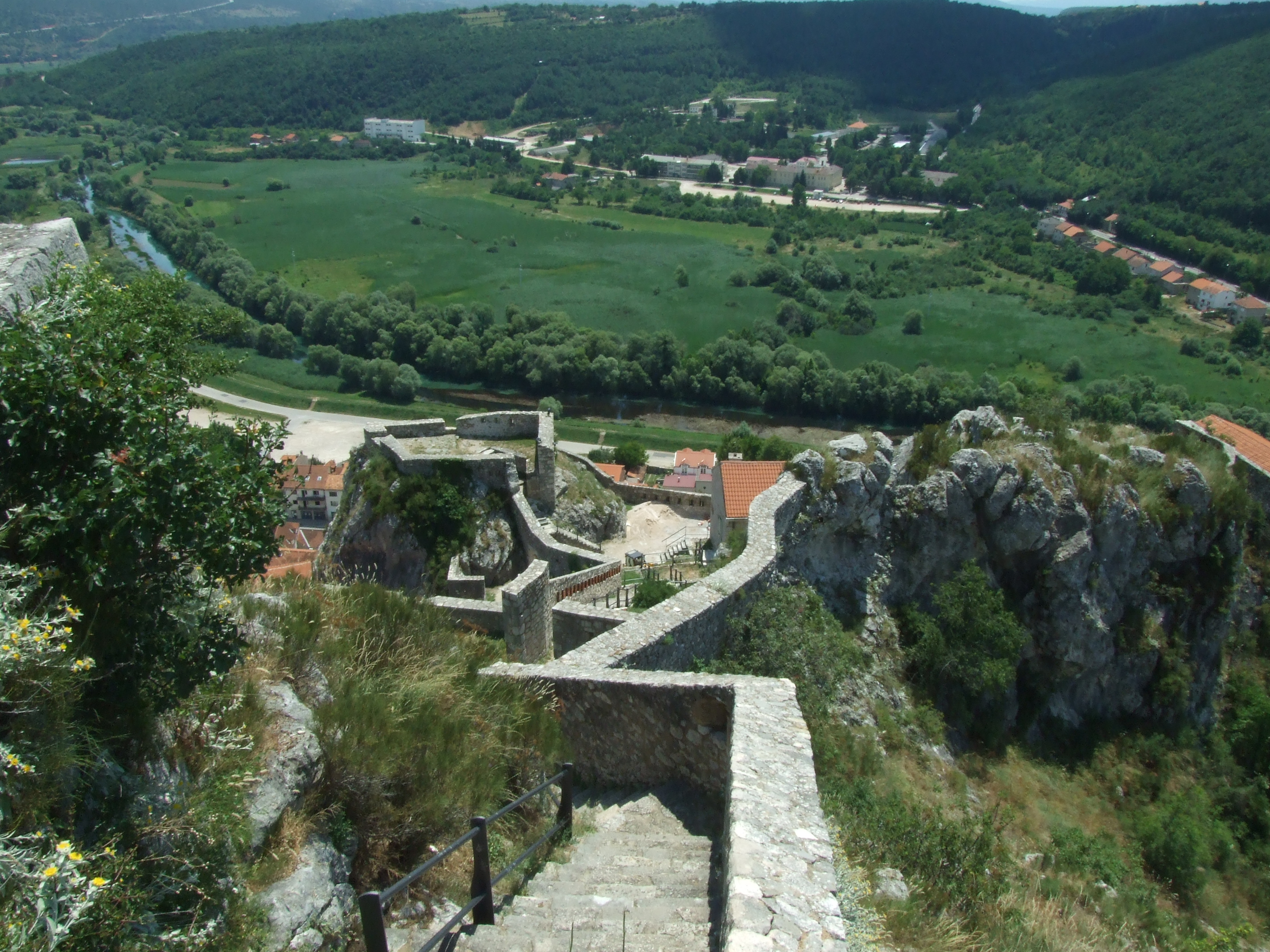
South

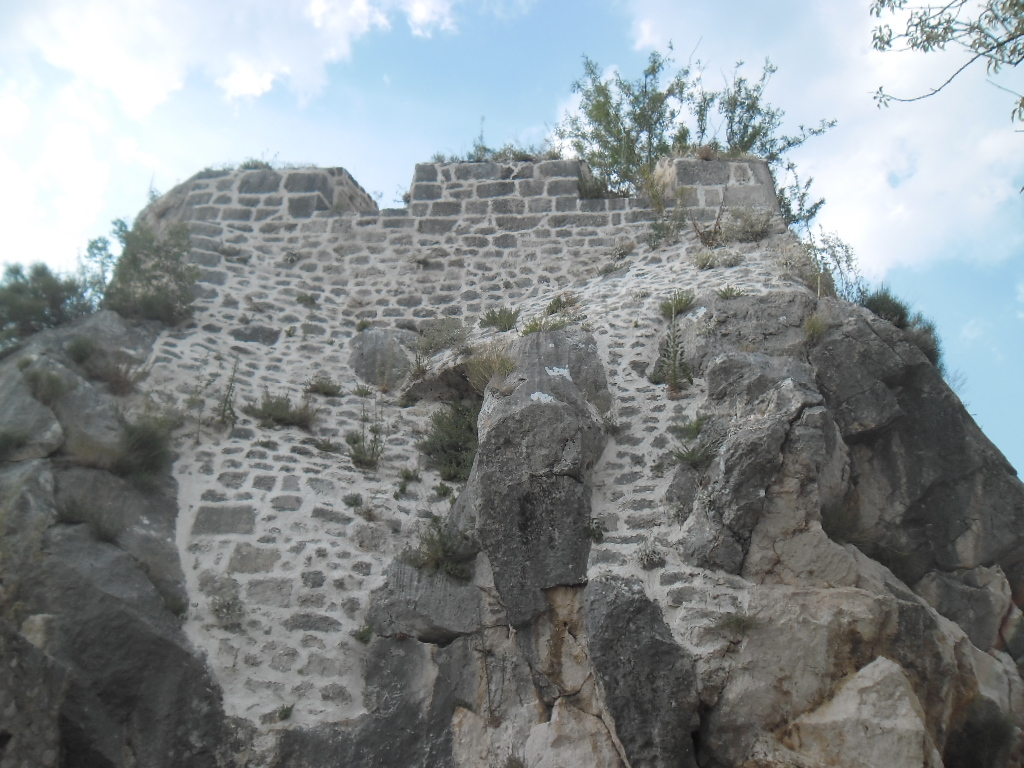
Detail of the fortress

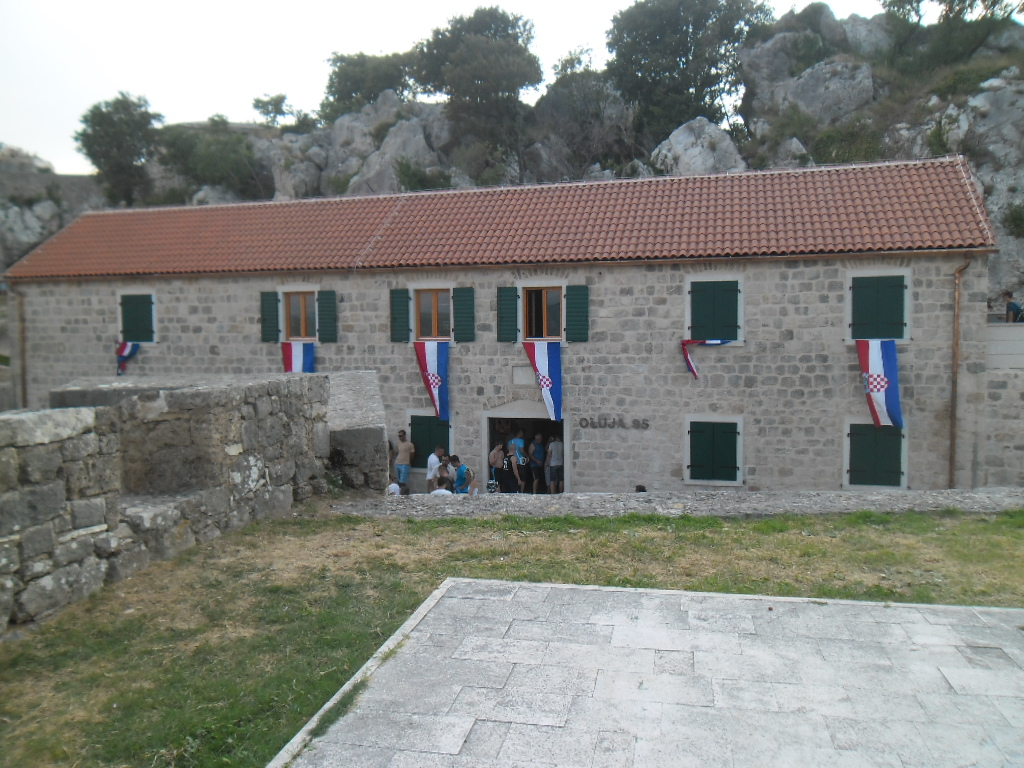
Operation Storm Museum, opened in 2015

The Croats built the fortress near a devastated Roman settlement (Latin: Tignino castro), soon after they settled in the area. Its guardians continuously upgraded the structure to accommodate the defensive needs at that time. It was one of the residences of Croatian monarchs, and possibly became the main residence later, since it was much safer to rule from Knin over the lands of Liburnia and Dalmatia, and to Christianize the pagan Croats in Gacka, Lika and Krbava. This is testified by a handful of churches in the Knin area built in the time of Duke Trpimir.

The fortress contained few ceremonial halls and the palace of the Croatian rulers, in which they issued their documents and lived with their courtiers during their stay in Knin. On the other more raised plateau of the mountain Spas, south from the fortress Tnena, a second, smaller fortification was built; the Citadel Lab (Latin: castro Lab, Labwar) which was the seat of the viceban.

The Diocese of Knin was established in 1040 by King Stephen I of Croatia, which spanned the area to the river Drava. The bishop of Knin had also the nominal title as the "Croatian bishop".

The fortress was divided to a small and a big town in the 14th century. The small town was used primarily for defensive reasons, while the big town comprised the flats that were occupied by the town's governors, bishops or župans. Suburbs were located just outside the walls. The oldest section is the upper town on the northern side of the fortress, while the middle and lower towns were built in the Late Middle Ages.

It is possible that, in the 15th century, during the raising danger of the Ottoman advance towards Europe, an additional railing defensive wall was constructed on which the main entrance to the fortress is situated today. Both of these fortifications, citadels, were connected in a unified defensive complex. In May 1522, the Ottomans laid a siege on Knin that ended on 29 May 1522 with an Ottoman victory. It was conquered by the Venetians in 1688, and held until 1797 and the fall of the Republic of Venice.

The oldest known graphical presentation of Knin was recorded on a map of northern Dalmatia and Lika by a Venetian cartographer Matteo Pagano (1515–1588), in about 1525. However, the more detailed description of the urban appearance of the fortification was handed by another Venetian, the military engineer named Orazio Antonio Alberghetti (1656–1690) in one of his schemes made at the time of the expulsion of the Ottomans in 1688.

== Flag ==
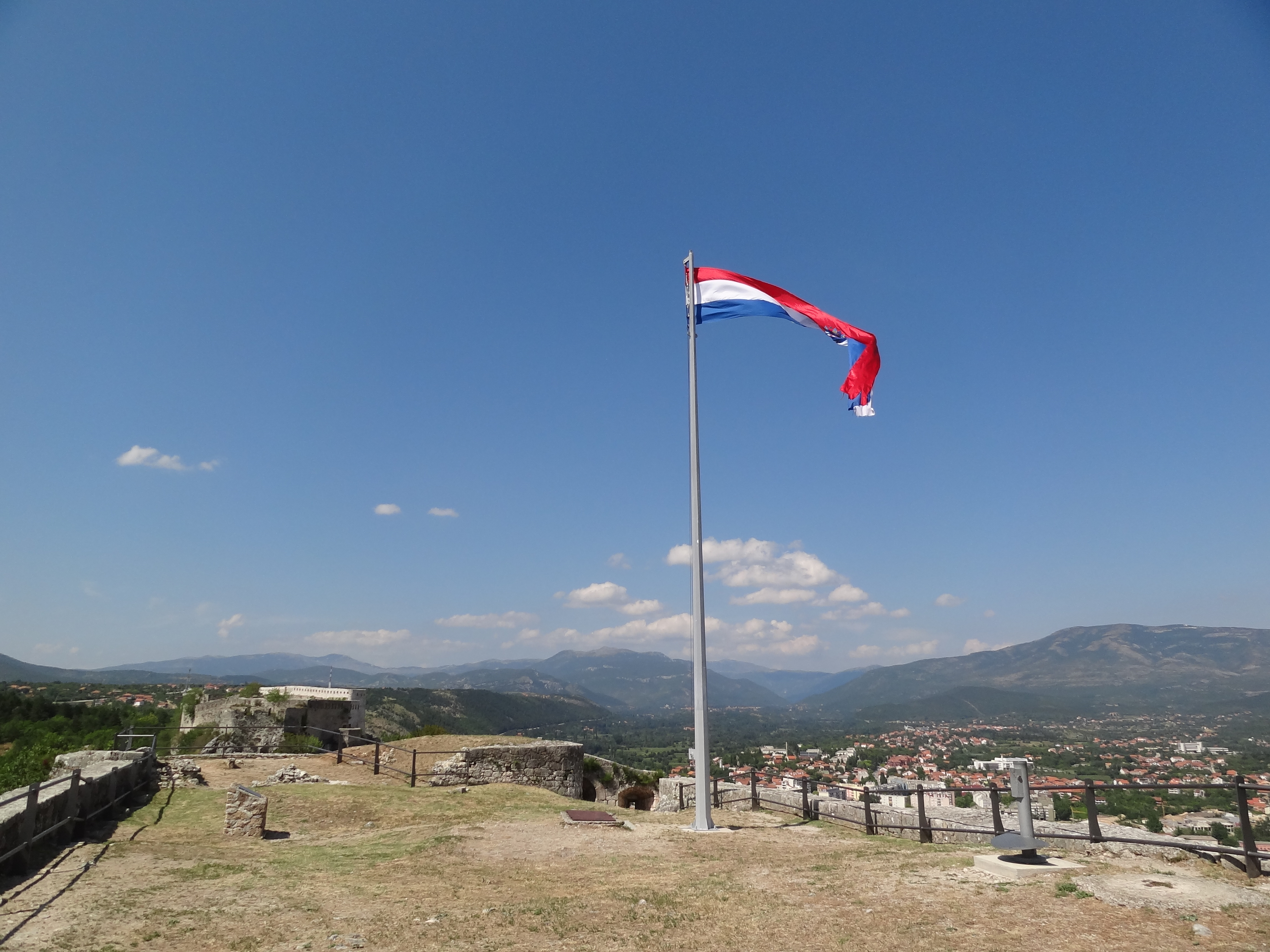
Flag of Croatia on Knin Fortress, 2015.

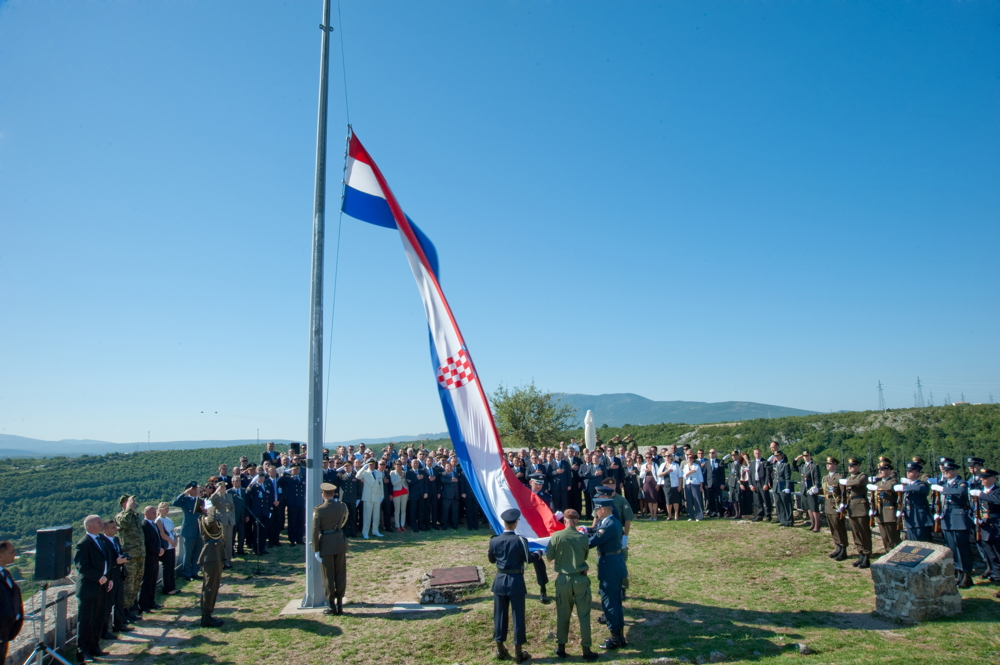
The ceremony of raising the Croatian flag on Knin Fortress in the presence of Croatian leadership during the celebration of the Victory Day, 5 August 2011.

The Flag of Croatia on Knin Fortress is one of few most important symbols of the recent history of Croatia. The flag was raised for the first time during the Operation Storm, the last major battle of the Croatian War of Independence. Following the capture of Knin (capital of the self-proclaimed proto-state Republic of Serbian Krajina) on 5 August 1995, the flag was firstly raised by the commander of the 7th Guards Brigade ("Pumas") of the Croatian Army, General Ivan Korade, and the next day by the President of Croatia Franjo Tuđman as well.

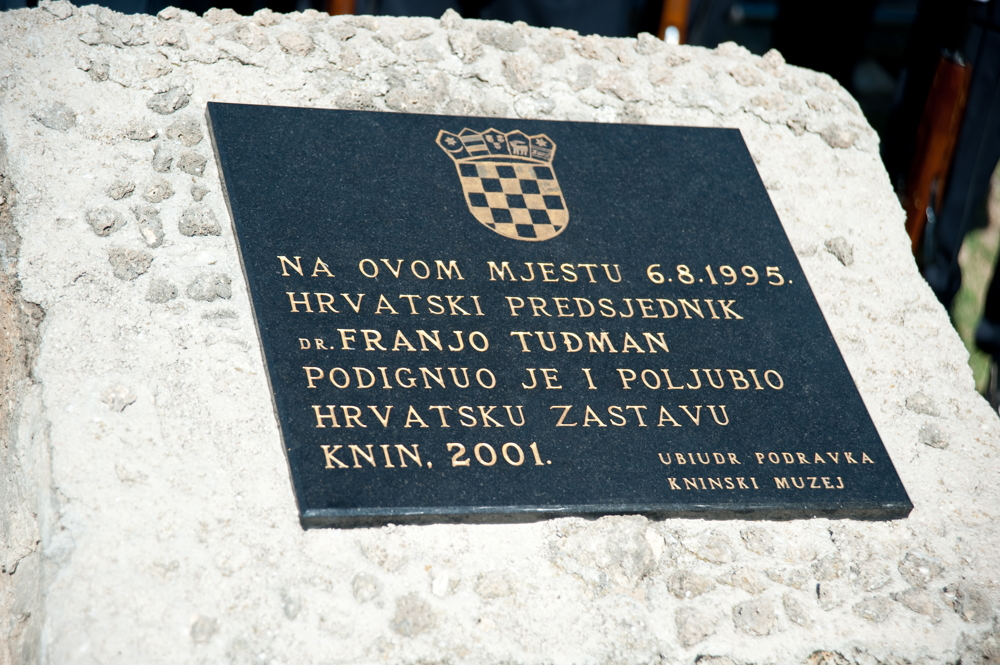
The memorial plaque opposite the flag.

In addition to its symbolic value, today it has become one of the biggest tourist attractions of Knin and the "obligatory" place for visitors. The original 20-meter flag fluttered during the military parade in Zagreb in 2015, on the occasion of the Victory Day and the 20th anniversary of the Operation Storm.

== Gallery ==
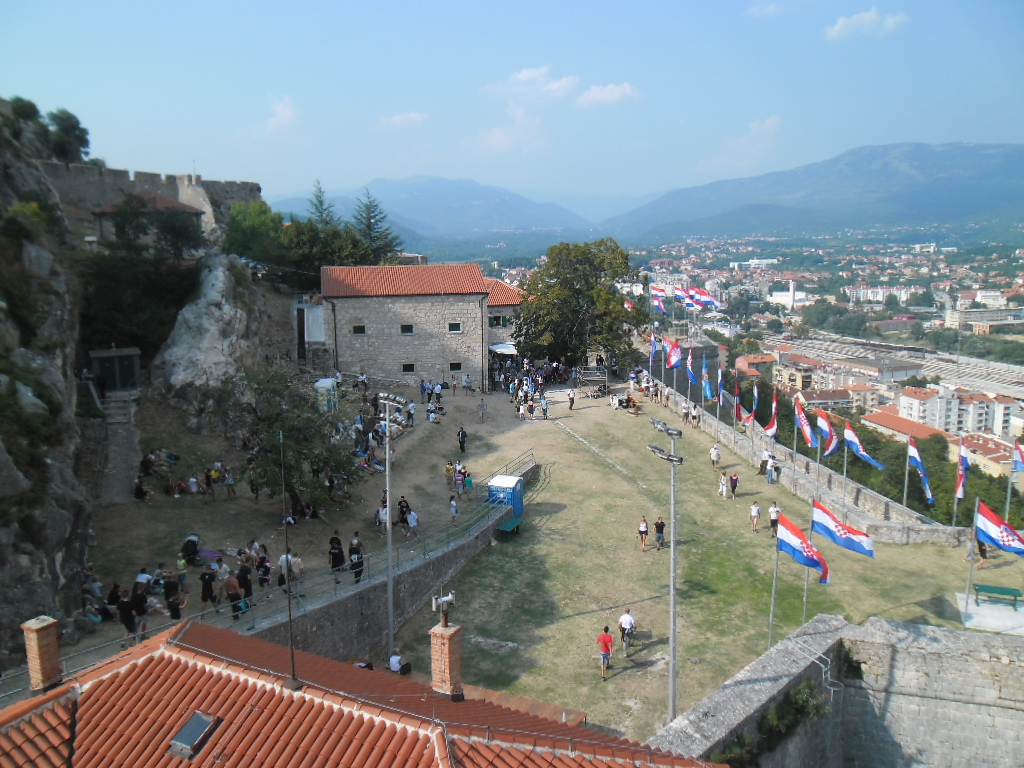

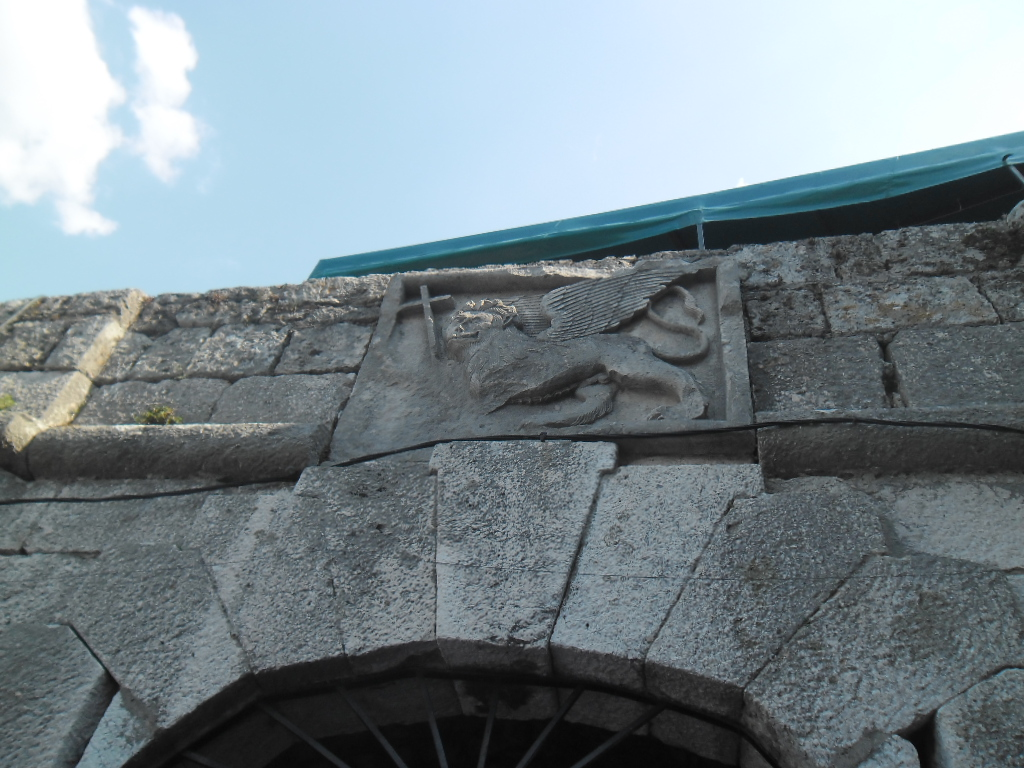

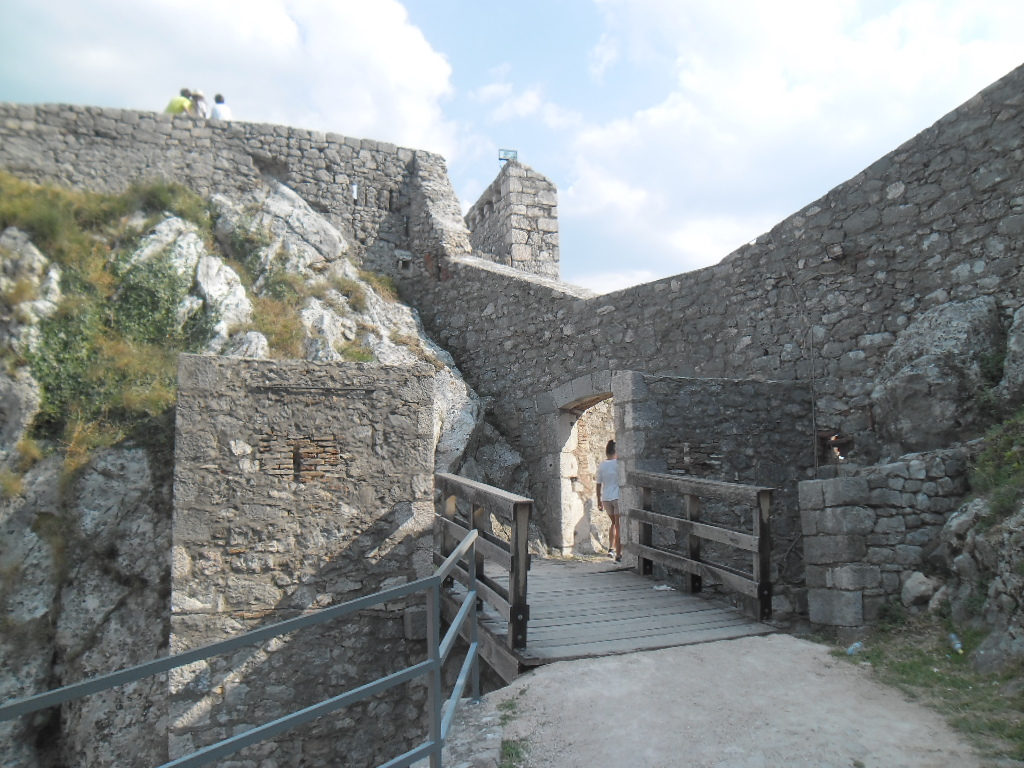

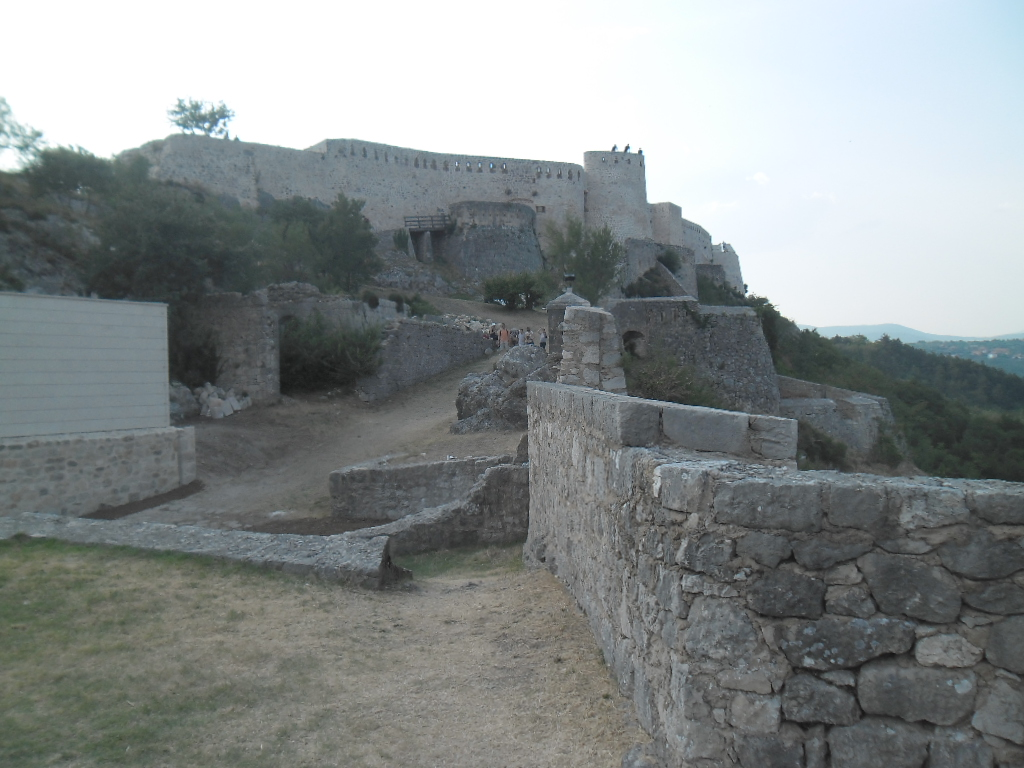

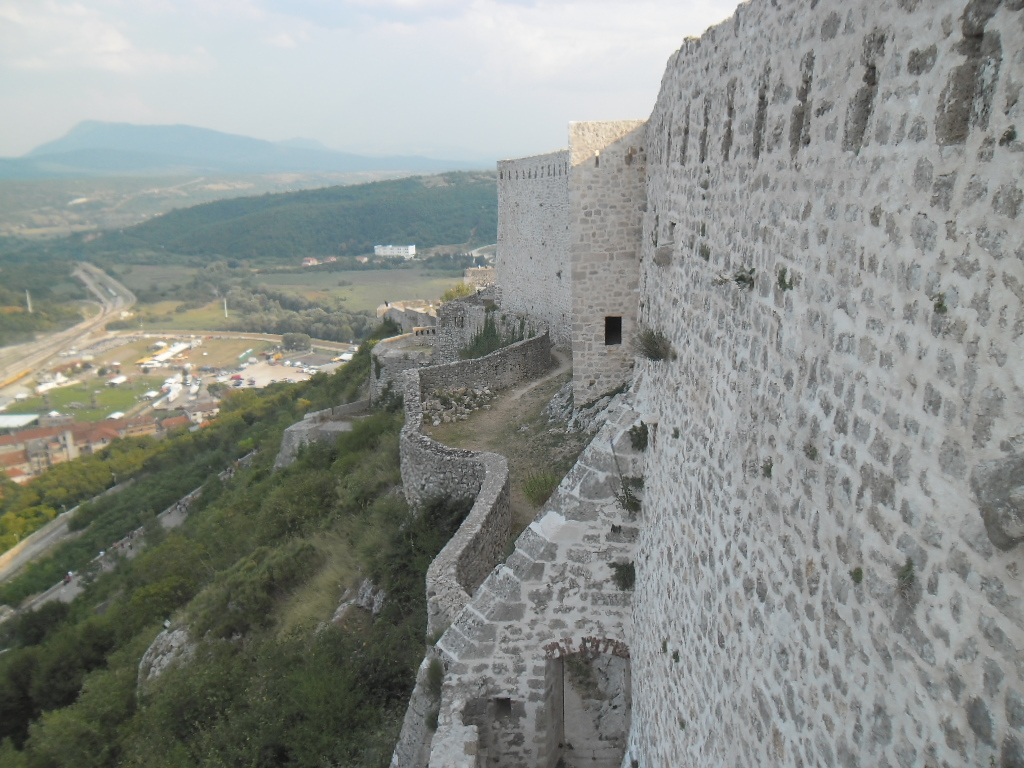

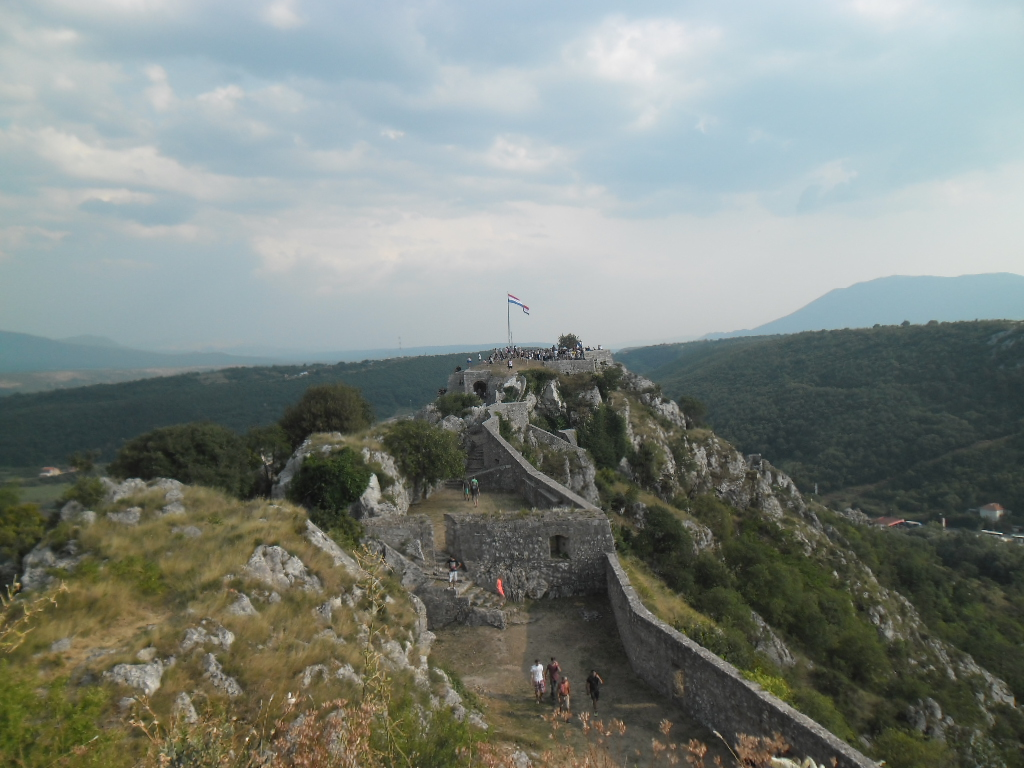

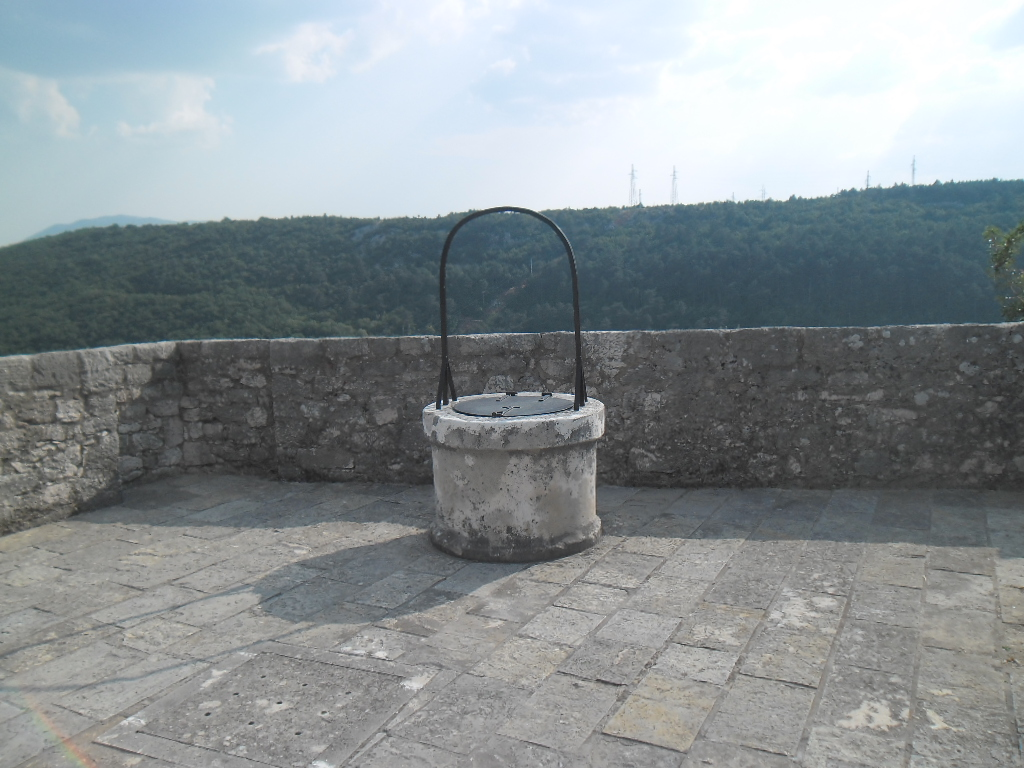

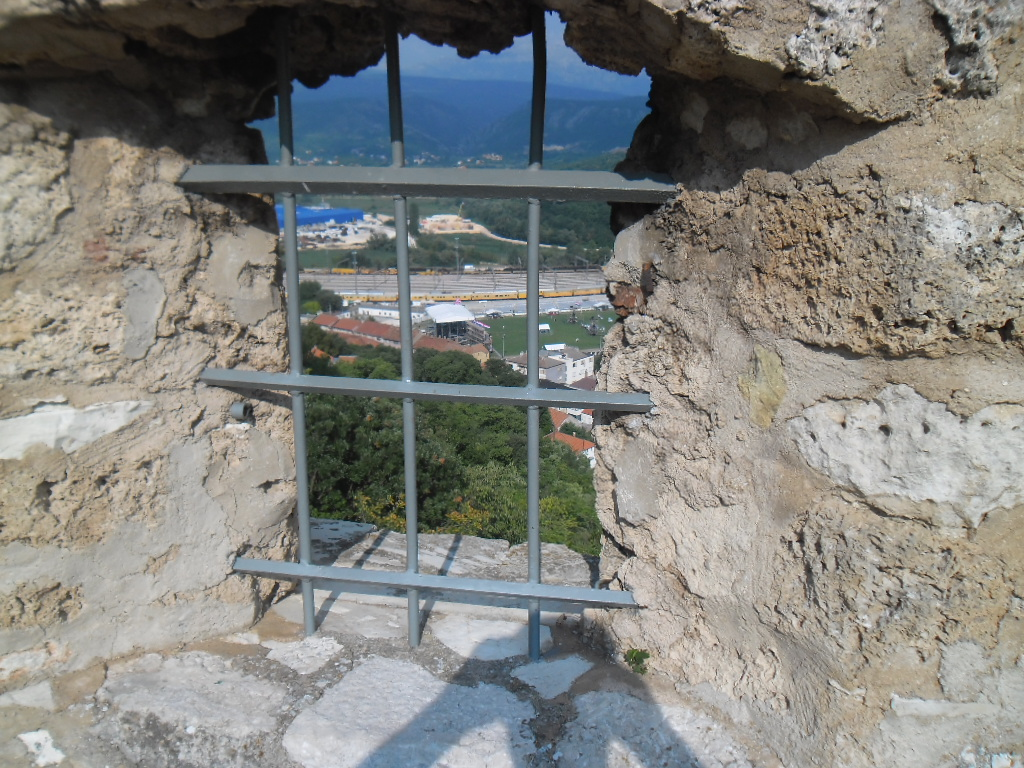

== See also ==
- Knin
- List of castles in Croatia
- Timeline of Croatian history
