= Kune =

Kune may refer to:

- Kune (software), a distributed social network software
- The Kune dialect of the Bininj Kunwok language, an Aboriginal Australian language
  - The people associated with the dialect, one of the Bininj group

== Croatia ==
- Kune, the plural form of the currency Croatian kuna
- Tank Battalion "Kune" (Croatia), a Croatian army armoured unit
- 3rd Guards Brigade "Kune" (Croatia), a disbanded Croatian army armoured unit

== See also ==
- Kuna (disambiguation)
- Kunekune, a breed of domestic pig
