= 3rd Guards Brigade =

3rd Guards Brigade may refer to:

== German ==
- 3rd Guards Cavalry Brigade (German Empire)
- 3rd Guards Artillery Brigade (German Empire)
- 3rd Guards Infantry Brigade (German Empire)

== Others ==
- 3rd Guards Brigade (Croatia)
- 3rd Guards Spetsnaz Brigade
- 3rd Guards Brigade (United Kingdom)
