= Operation Brđani '91 =

- Part of the Croatian War of Independence
Date	August 22, 1991; 35 years ago
Location	Sunja, Sisak, Croatia
Result	Yugoslav People's Army victory

Belligerents
Yugoslavia	Croatia

Commanders and leaders
Unknown	(Croatia) Davor Smuđ

Units involved
Yugoslav People's Army: Yugoslav Ground Forces	Croatian Interior Ministry; 2nd Guards Brigade "Thunders, Gromovi" (Croatia) Independent 57th battalion "Marijan Celjak”

Strength
Unknown	86 – 87 troops

Casualties and losses
Unknown	5 killed, 17 wounded,
- 1 Croatian soldier killed and 2 wounded during railway station ambush

Operation Brđani '91 (Croatian: Operacija Brđani '91) was a military action under taken by the Croatian National Guard (Croatian: Zbor narodne garde, ZNG) and the 2nd Guards Brigade on August 22, 1991. The goal of the Croatian National Guard (Croatian: Zbor narodne garde, ZNG) and the 2nd Guards Brigade was to unblock communication lines between Sunja and Sisak in the Banovina region, which were under JNA – SAO Krajina control, the Croatian forces participating in this operation also attempted to stop the advance of the Yugoslav People's Army in the SAO Western Slavonia battleground, including the roads around Komarevo and Sunj.

== Order of battle ==
The Croatian tactical group included 3 various units, whilst the number of Yugoslav People's Army personnel is unknown. The Croatian tactical lacked sufficient weaponry and supplies. The Croatian tactical group included; Croatian Interior Ministry, 2nd Guards Brigade "Thunders, Gromovi" and the Independent 57th "Marijan Celjak" battalion. The Serbs had more modern equipment and more weaponry, which was used by the Yugoslav People's Army during the operation.

== Timeline ==
At midnight, a Croatian National Guard (ZNG) company, led by one of the commanders from the units of the Croatian tactical group, set out from Komarevo to liberate the road to Sunja. The company navigated through Magyars, Letovanaci, Čakal, and Trnjan before reaching the Brđani Kosa road. After a long and challenging journey, the company arrived at the Brđani Kosa road and was greeted by the villagers, who had been subjected to years of Yugoslav People's Army (JNA) occupation. The company paused to regroup and reorganize before receiving reinforcements.

After the Croats regrouped their forces, the ZNG forces advanced towards Sunja, but their progress was halted near Brđan Cesta. The JNA launched a fierce counterattack, raining down bullets and artillery fire on the ZNG positions. Five ZNG fighters were killed in action, and 17 others were wounded. Despite the intense fighting, the ZNG refused to retreat, continuing to defend their positions with all available resources.

=== Railway station ambush ===
As dawn began to break a day later, the ZNG forces regrouped at the Sunja railway station. Unbeknownst to them, the JNA had planned a decisive ambush. From this advantageous position, they unleashed a torrent of machine gun fire and artillery shells upon the exhausted ZNG troops. The ferocity of the attack caught the Croats off guard, sending shockwaves through their ranks. In this chaotic moment, 1 more ZNG fighters lost their lives, while many others were injured. The JNA’s relentless onslaught forced the ZNG to fall back and reorganize their lines. Despite this setback, the ZNG refused to yield, determined to push forward and reclaim their territory.

== Aftermath ==
The Croatian Army suffered 5 killed and 17 wounded, all of whom belonged to the 2nd Guards Brigade "Gromovi, Thunders" the Croats, whom lacked aforementioned Weaponry and supplies managed to inflict casualties on Yugoslav Personnel.

The Croatian Army failed to meet its goal of reconnecting communications with Sisak and Sunja, this included its other goals. With the aftermath of Operation Brđani '91, the defense of the Sisak-Sunja commenced, as the Yugoslav People's Army had been invading the Banovina region since Mid 1991.
