= Ivan Korade =

Croatian Army general and mass murderer (1963–2008)

- Born: 17 December 1963; Velika Veternička, SR Croatia, SFR Yugoslavia
- Died: 3 April 2008 (aged 44); Velika Veternička, Croatia
- Military career
- Allegiance: Croatia
- Branch: Croatian Army
- Service years: 1991–1997
- Rank: Major General
- Unit: 1st Guards Brigade
- Commands: 7th Guards Brigade
- Conflicts: Croatian War of Independence and Bosnian War Operation Storm Operation Mistral 2

Ivan Korade (17 December 1963 – 3 April 2008) was a Croatian Army general best known for his role in the Croatian War of Independence. Korade's long history of violent behaviour resulted in forced retirement in 1997 and culminated in a 2008 shooting spree in which he murdered five people before committing suicide.

== Early life and military career ==
Ivan Korade was born in 1963 in Velika Veternička, a village in Novi Golubovec municipality, near Zlatar, Hrvatsko Zagorje. Before the start of the Yugoslav Wars, he worked as a central heating installer. His military career began in 1991, when he volunteered for a special operations police unit.

After the Croatian National Guard was formed, he joined the 1st Guards Brigade ("The Tigers") and became a battalion commander in 1992. He was badly injured in Dubrovnik in 1992, losing his left arm, but returned to action after only two weeks of recovery, and became the first commander of the newly formed 7th Guards Brigade ("Pumas") in 1993. His brigade was the first to enter Knin on 5 August 1995, and Korade raised the Croatian flag at the Knin Fortress. He returned to fight in Bosnia in September 1995. He retired in 1997 after causing brawls during football matches at the club "Bojovnik 7".

== After retirement ==
In September 2000, Korade was one of the signers of the Twelve Generals' Letter. In the following years, he was linked to various crimes, including beatings and drunk driving. In 2001, he was convicted of violent behaviour and maltreatment of a man six years earlier, and Korade received a suspended eight-month sentence. Croatian authorities were criticised for allowing these incidents to occur.

== Murders ==
On 1 April 2008, Korade was charged with the 27 March murders of four people in his native village (Velika Veternička): a 16-year-old boy, a 62-year-old female relative, and two men, including a former aide, Davor Petriš. Croatian media reported that one of the victims was shot in the eyes and another was stabbed with a knife. He went missing after the killings and hundreds of police officers, backed by several helicopters, searched for him in the village and the surrounding area.

The manhunt took eight days. In the beginning, he wasn't accused of the murders but arrested and detained by the police as a "person who can help in the resolving of the case". After a few days, police found Korade's vehicle near the forest and started to investigate the forest. Few nights after, police spotted a person who fit "Korade's description" with a thermal vision camera, but did not manage to arrest him.

=== Death ===
On 3 April 2008, police officers found a bottle of alcohol and saw a broken window on one house. They started walking towards the house to investigate it, but suddenly rifle gunshot started from a house and one police officer was wounded. He died on the way to the hospital. Police then surrounded the house and started throwing tear gas into the house. When police finally broke into the house, Korade was dead. He had been hiding in a house in Velika Veternička when police surrounded him. Surrounded with bombs and other weapons, Korade apparently committed suicide; although local media claimed he had been killed by police.

== Aftermath ==
Korade was buried at Petrova Gora, and the funeral was attended by many of his comrades. The locals of Veternička publicly expressed a desire for him to be buried elsewhere. Mario Kusanić, the policeman fatally shot by Korade, was posthumously decorated with the Order of Petar Zrinski and Fran Krsto Frankopan.

By committing suicide, Korade escaped being tried for war crimes during Operation Mistral 2 in Glamoč, Bosnia and Herzegovina (1995), where he commanded over the "Pumas".

By decree of President Stjepan Mesić, all Korade's decorations - except for the Order of the Croatian Cross, a wound medal - were posthumously revoked.
