= Guards Armoured Mechanized Brigade (Croatia) =

- Gardijska oklopno-mehanizirana brigada (GOMBR)
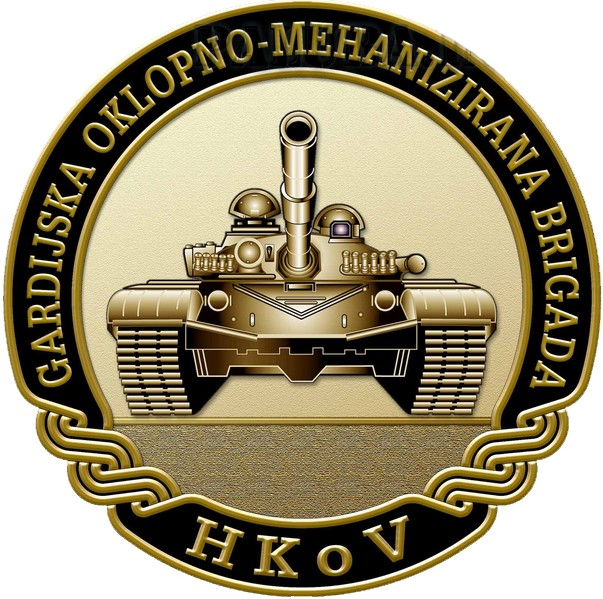
- Badge of the Guards Armoured Mechanized Brigade
- Active: 2007–present
- Country: Croatia
- Branch: Croatian Army
- Type: Armoured warfare
- Size: Brigade
- Garrison/HQ: Vinkovci
- Anniversaries: 20 March
- Equipment: M-84A4 Sniper; M-80; M2 Bradley A2 ODS SA

Commanders
- Current commander: Brigadier Željko Marinov

Guards Armoured Mechanized Brigade (Croatian: Gardijska oklopno-mehanizirana brigada (GOMBR)) is armoured mechanized infantry brigade of the Croatian Army which together with the Guards Mechanized Brigade, are the two combat capable formations of the Land Forces.

As part of international military operations, members of the Guards Armoured Mechanized Brigade were the first to participate in the UNDOF mission, where they monitored the ceasefire between Israel and Syria in the Golan Heights. During the ISAF mission, the bulk of the forces of the 13th HRVCON came from the GOMBR, numbering more than 150 members.

The Guards Armoured Mechanized Brigade (GOMBR) is the successor of the 3rd Guards Armoured Mechanized Brigade (2003-2007), which was formed with the merger of three wartime guards brigades of the Croatian army:

- 3rd Guards Brigade "Martens"
- 5th Guards Brigade "Falcons"
- 7th Guards Brigade "Pumas"

== Main Role ==
Fundamental mission of the Guards Armoured Mechanized Brigade is to defend the sovereignty and integrity of the Republic of Croatia, develop and maintain the ability to participate in international military operations, and to be ready to provide assistance to civilian institutions in the country in the event of natural and technical-technological disasters.

Tasks of the Guards Armoured Mechanized Brigade:

- Implementation of offensive operations
- Implementation of stabilisation operations
- Implementation of security and force protection operations
- Establishment of a command-and-control system
- Ensuring the sustainability of the unit
- Supporting civil institutions in natural and technical-technological disasters

== Structure ==
- Brigade Command (Vinkovci)
  - Command Company (Vinkovci)
  - Tank Battalion "Kune" (Đakovo)
  - (A second tank battalion will be formed)
  - 1st Tracked Mechanized Infantry Battalion "Sokolovi" (Našice)
  - 2nd Tracked Mechanized Infantry Battalion "Pume" (Varaždin)
  - Mixed Artillery Battalion (Bjelovar)
  - Air Defence Battalion (Vinkovci)
  - Engineer Battalion (Vinkovci)
  - Reconnaissance Company (Vinkovci)
  - Signals Company (Vinkovci)

== Composition ==
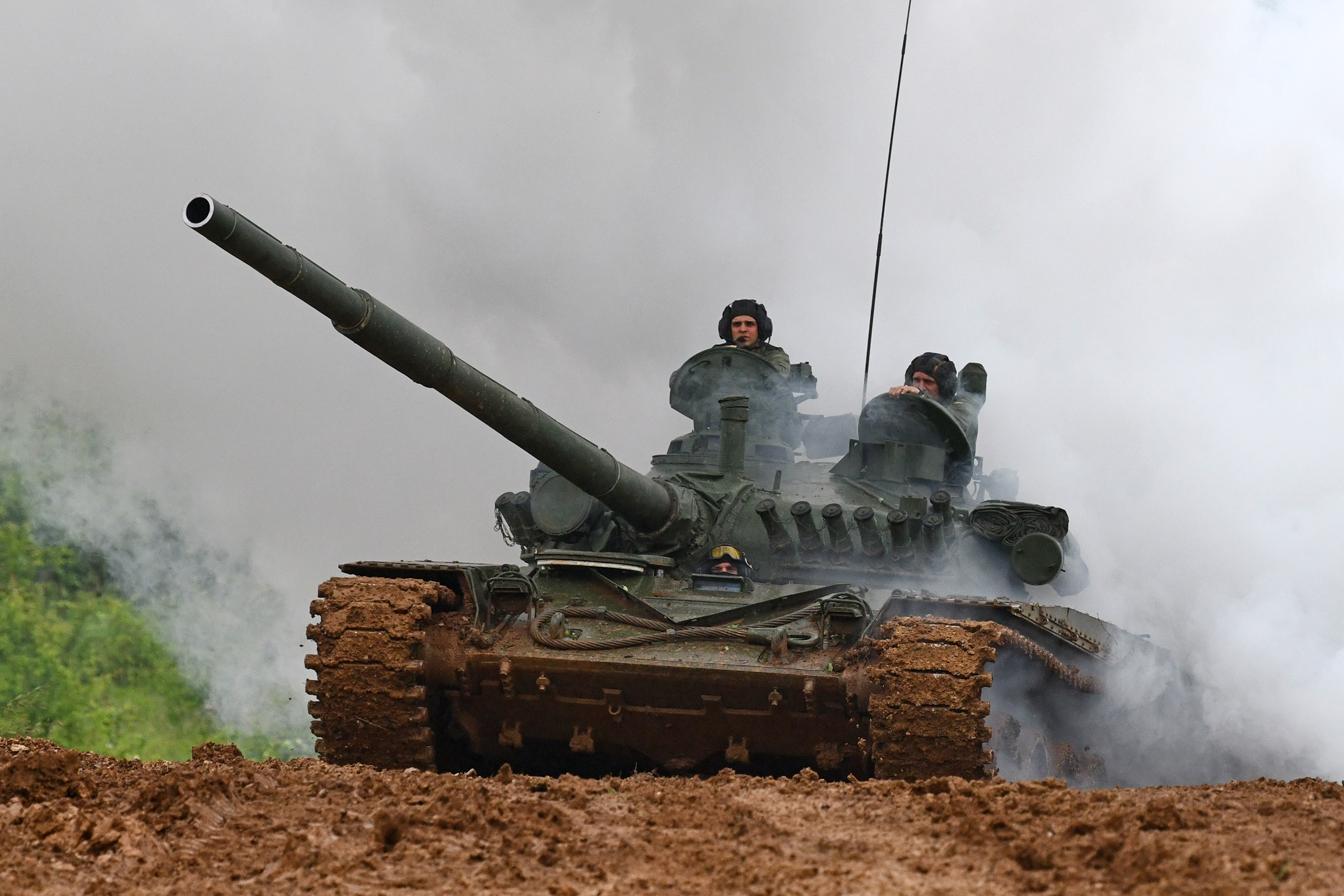
M-84 tank of the Tank Battalion "Kune"

The formation of these war units began in the spring of 1991, when the 3rd Guards Brigade of the National Guard Corps was formed. Today, the Tank Battalion "Kune" bears its name and celebrates the anniversary of the 3rd Guards Brigade and the Battalion Day on 29 April. The headquarters of the tank battalion "Kune" is in the barracks of the 3rd Guards Brigade "Kune" in Đakovo.

The 5th Guards Brigade "Sokolovi" was established on 15 October 1992 in the "Bosut" barracks in Vinkovci. During its formation, the 83rd Guards Battalion and the 5th Guards Brigade "Sokolovi" became part of it. She has been awarded numerous awards and commendations for her contribution to the Homeland War. Today, the 1st Armoured-Mechanized Battalion "Sokolovi" is the bearer of the tradition of the "Slavonian Falcons". The headquarters of the unit is in the barracks of the "132nd Brigade of the Croatian Army" in Našice, on 5 October it celebrates the Battalion Day.

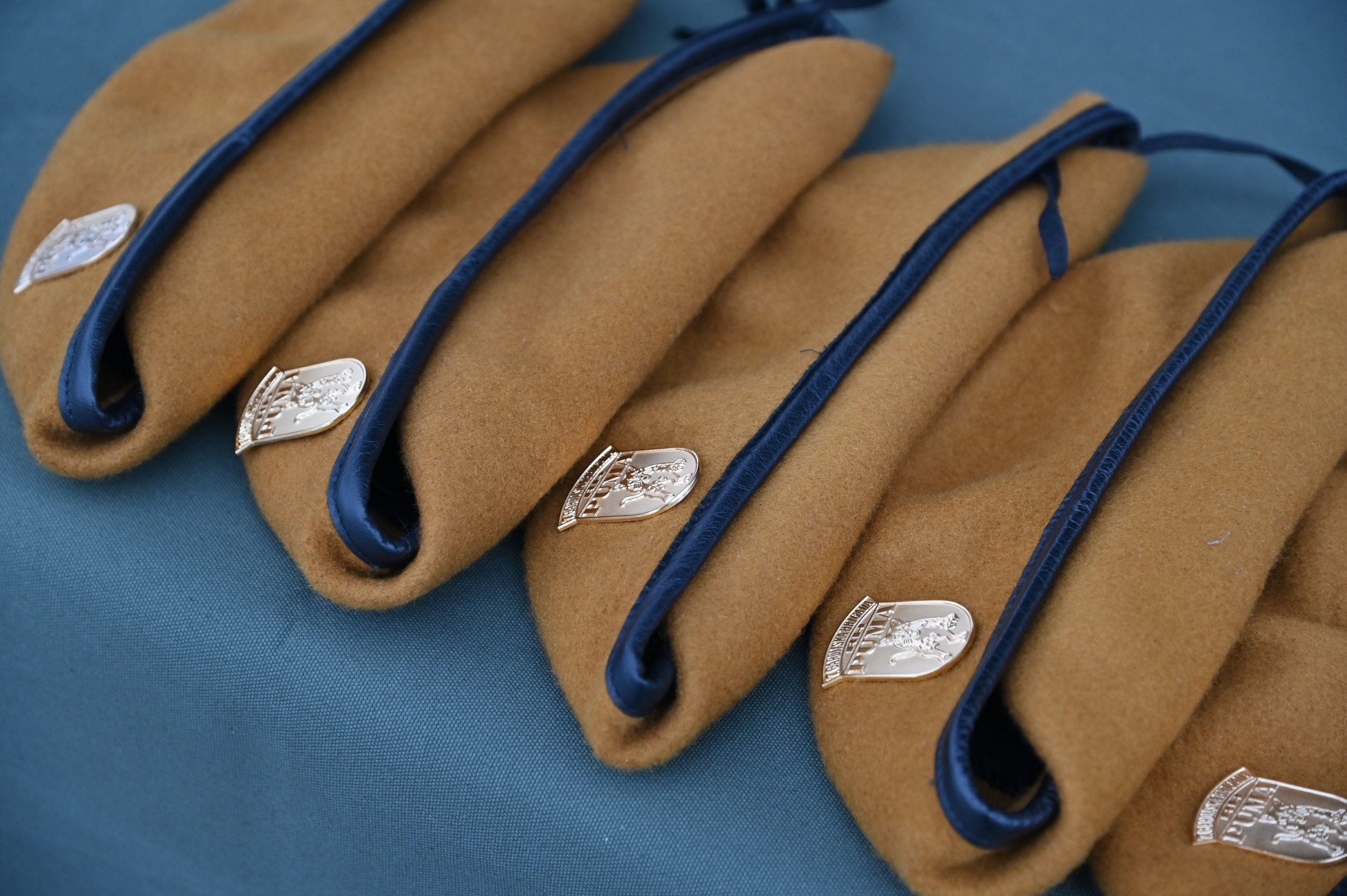
Berets of the 2nd Armoured-mechanized Battalion "Pume"

The 7th Guards Brigade "Puma" was formed on 23 December 1992 according to the order of the Minister of Defense of the Republic of Croatia, and its members are today part of the 2nd Armored Mechanized Battalion "Puma" of the Guards Armoured Mechanized Brigade. The unit received numerous recognitions and praises for its contribution to the Homeland War, and in the Operation "Storm" it was among the first to enter city of Knin. The unit celebrates the anniversary of the 7th Guards Brigade "Puma" and the Battalion Day on 23 December. The headquarters of the 2nd Motorized Battalion "Puma" is in Varaždin in the barracks of the 7th Guards Brigade "Puma".

== See also ==
- 2nd Guards Brigade (Croatia)
- 3rd Guards Brigade (Croatia)
- 7th Guards Brigade (Croatia)
- 9th Guards Brigade (Croatia)

== Sources ==
- Hrvatski vojnik, 23 December 2009,
