= Kuna (surname) =

Kuna is a surname.

- Henryk Kuna (1885–1945), Polish sculptor
- Herta Kuna, Croatian and Bosnian-Herzegovinian philologist and historian
- Josip Kuna (born 1972), Croatian sport shooter
- Kuna Srisailam Goud (born 1965), Indian politician
- Izabela Kuna (born 1970), Polish film, television and theatre actress and blogger
- Ladislav Kuna (1947–2012), Slovak football player
- Péter Kuna (born 1965), Hungarian water polo player

== See also ==
- Kuna (disambiguation)
