= KUNA =

KUNA may refer to:

- KUNA-FM, a radio station (96.7 FM) licensed to La Quinta, California, United States
- KUNA-LD, a low-power television station (channel 15) licensed to Indio, California, United States
- Kuwait News Agency
