= Tank Battalion "Kune" (Croatia) =

Tank Battalion "Kune" Tenkovska bojna "Kune"
- Active: 2007 – present
- Country: Croatia
- Branch: Croatian Army
- Part of: Guards Armoured Mechanized Brigade
- Garrison/HQ: Đakovo
- Nicknames: Martens; Kune
- Anniversaries: April 29th

Tank Battalion "Kune" (lit. "Martens") (Croatian: Tenkovska bojna "Kune") is an armoured unit within the Guards Armoured Mechanized Brigade (GOMBR) of the Croatian Army.

== History ==
Established in its current form after the reorganisation of the Armed Forces of Croatia in 2007, the Tank Battalion bears the name of Kune (Martens), inheriting it from the wartime 3rd Guards Brigade "Kune"

== Organisation ==
Garrisoned at 3rd Guards Brigade "Kune" Barracks in Đakovo, the tank battalion is composed of three tank companies of M-84 main battle tanks, command company, reconnaissance platoon, signals platoon and a logistics company.

== Operations ==
In the past, members of the tank battalion have been deployed in support of the NATO ISAF mission in Afghanistan as part of the Croatian Contingent (HRVCON), United Nations Interim Force in Lebanon (UNIFIL) and other UN and NATO peacekeeping operations.
