= Kuny =

Kuny may refer to the following places in Poland:

- Kuny, Lower Silesian Voivodeship (south-west Poland)
- Kuny, Greater Poland Voivodeship (west-central Poland)
