= Kuna (cryptocurrency exchange) =

Ukrainian cryptocurrency exchange

KUNA
- Type: Public Company
- Industry: Financial Services, Cryptocurrency
- Founded: 2016; 10 years ago (after ICO)
- Founder: Michael Chobanian
- Defunct: 2025
- Headquarters: Kyiv, Ukraine
- Website: kuna.io

Kuna (Ukrainian: Куна) was a Ukrainian and CIS cryptocurrency exchange.

== History ==
Kuna was founded in 2016 by Michael Chobanian as the first cryptocurrency exchange in Ukraine and the CIS region.

During the 2022 Russian invasion of Ukraine, Kuna became a major fundraising platform in Ukraine, reportedly accumulating over $100 million in cryptocurrency donations.

== Investigation and closure ==
The subject of a tax evasion investigation, in late January 2025 the company commenced an orderly shut-down in the wake of an unannounced withdrawal of Internet connectivity to domestic customers ordered by the Shevchenkivsky District Court of Kyiv – this sanction was at the request of the Bureau of Economic Security of Ukraine (BEB). The corporate decision having been made not to contest the matter, Kuna wrapped up operations completely on April 30, 2025 and ceased to exist.
