= 7th Guards Brigade (Croatia) =

7th Motorized Guards Brigade
- Active: December 1992 – July 2003
- Disbanded: 7 July 2003
- Country: Croatia
- Branch: Ground Army
- Nickname(s): Pume (Pumas)
- Engagements: Croatian War of Independence: Operation Maslenica; Operation Winter '94; Operation Summer '95; Operation Storm; Operation Mistral 2; Operation Southern Move

The 7th Guards Brigade (Croatian: 7. gardijska brigada), also known by their nickname Pumas (Croatian: Pume), was a Croatian Ground Army (HV) brigade formed on 23 December 1992 in Varaždin. The brigade was initially formed out of the 5th Battalion of the 1st "Tigers" Brigade and its first commander was Ivan Korade, who led the unit during the War of Independence (1991–95).

The 7th Brigade was disbanded in 2003 when it merged with the 2nd "Thunders" Brigade. In March 2008 the 2nd Brigade was also disbanded. Members of the former 7th Brigade who had served in the 2nd Brigade 2003–08 were then incorporated into the present-day Armoured Guards Brigade (Gardijska oklopno-mehanizirana brigada or GOMBR) and formed a battalion which uses the original 7th Brigade's nickname and emblem.

== Commanders ==
- Ivan Korade (1992–1996)
- Željko Dvekar (1996–1999)
- Marijan Kretić (1999)
- Branko Predragović (1999–2002)
- Marijan Kretić (2002–2003)

== See also ==
- Croatian National Guard
