= 2nd Guards Brigade (Croatia) =

2nd Mechanized Guards Brigade
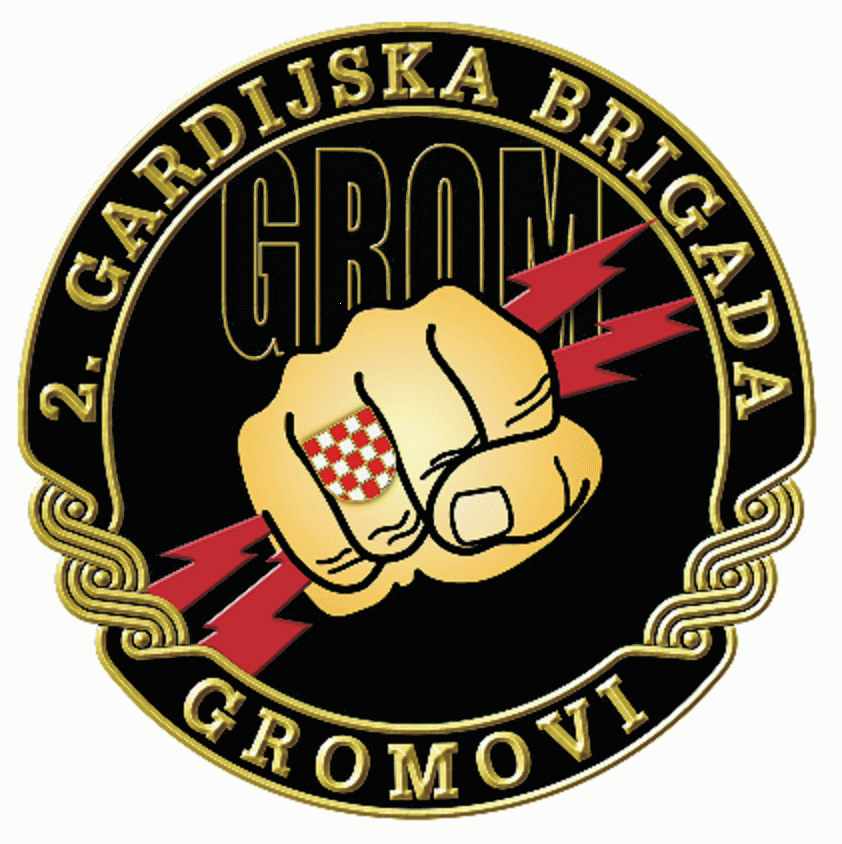
- Active: May 1991 – March 2008
- Disbanded: 31 March 2008
- Country: Croatia
- Branch: Ground Army
- Type: Mechanized infantry
- Nickname: Gromovi (The Thunders)
- Anniversaries: 15 May
- Engagements: Croatian War of Independence: Operation Brđani '91; Operation Whirlwind; Operation Maslenica; Operation Flash; Operation Storm; Battle of Petrinja (1995); Siege of Dubrovnik; Operation Una
- Decorations: Order of Duke Domagoj; Order of Nikola Šubić Zrinski

The 2nd Guards Brigade (Croatian: 2. gardijska brigada), nicknamed "the Thunders" (Croatian: Gromovi), was one of the original Croatian National Guard (ZNG) brigades formed in 1991 and one of the most elite mechanized infantry units in the Croatian Ground Army (HV) during its existence, during which it saw action in a number of engagements during the War of Independence (1991–1995).

As part of the large reorganization of the Croatian Armed Forces in the late 2000s the brigade was officially disbanded in March 2008, reduced to a battalion-sized unit stationed in Petrinja and incorporated into the Motorized Guard Brigade. The present-day battalion still uses the original brigade's nickname and emblem.

== History ==
The brigade was formed on 15 May 1991 at the Trstenik barracks near Dugo Selo, where the brigade command was established and the brigade's 1st infantry battalion was formed. The brigade was initially composed of members who joined from the Interior Ministry's special operations units based at Lučko, Rakitje, Kumrovec, Vinica, Sisak and Karlovac in northern Croatia, as it was originally formed within the Interior Ministry's framework as part of the ZNG, which later evolved into the Croatian Ground Army.

The 2nd battalion was formed on 3 June 1991 in Sisak, and the 3rd battalion was formed on 21 June 1991 in Duga Resa.

The Thunders' first engagement was in early June 1991 on the Mladost Bridge in Zagreb when they stopped the advance of the Yugoslav People's Army (JNA) tanks in the initial stages of the Battle of the Barracks. Over the course of the War of Independence elements of the brigade saw action in Central Croatia and Banovina regions. The brigade also took part in the Siege of Dubrovnik (Operation Tiger) and in operations in the Posavina region in northern Bosnia. They were also actively involved in Operation Maslenica, Operation Flash, Operation Storm and Operation Una.

During the war, 203 members of the brigade were killed in action, and 5 were missing as of 2013.

On 1 May 1996 the 81st Guards Battalion based in Virovitica was incorporated into the brigade and in 2003 the 2nd Guards Brigade was merged with the 7th "Pumas" Brigade.

== See also ==
- Croatian National Guard
