= 3rd Guards Brigade (Croatia) =

- 3. gardijska brigada
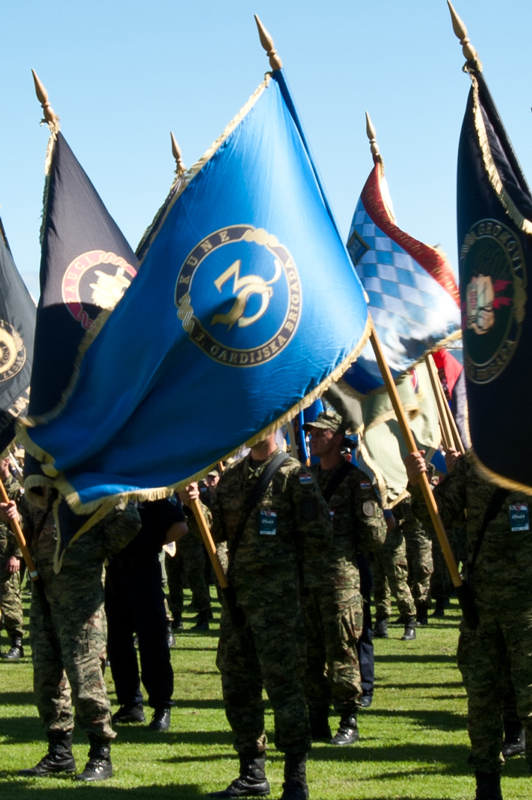
- Brigade flag
- Active: 29 April 1991 – 2003
- Disbanded: 2003
- Country: Croatia
- Branch: Ground Army
- Size: Brigade
- Nickname: Kune (Martens)
- Engagements: Croatian War of Independence: Battle of Vukovar; Battle of Osijek; Operation Maslenica; Operation Flash; Other operations; Bosnian War: Operation Corridor 92; Other operations

The 3rd Guards Brigade (Croatian: 3. gardijska brigada), nicknamed Kune ("Martens"), was a guards brigade of the Croatian Army, formed on 29 April 1991, in Vinkovci. During the Croatian War of Independence, the 3rd Guards Brigade primarily operated in the regions of Slavonia and Baranja in eastern Croatia.

== History ==
Originally formed as the 3rd "A" Brigade of the Croatian National Guard (ZNG) in 1991, the 3rd Guards Brigade initially consisted of four battalions stationed in Osijek, Vinkovci, Slavonski Brod and Vukovar.

During the war, approximately 10,000 men served with the brigade, which includes 369 killed, 1,088 injured and 17 missing in action.

Between 1991 and 1995, the 3rd Guards Brigade was involved in numerous engagements including:

- Battle of Vukovar (1991; 4th Battalion)
- Battle of Osijek (1991–92)
- Operation Maslenica (1993)
- Operation Flash (1995)

During Operation Storm in August 1995, the 3rd Guards Brigade was deployed to defend the city of Osijek, and did not see any combat.

== Post-war ==
In 2003 most of the brigade was disbanded, with remnants merged with the 5th Guards Brigade to form the 3rd Armoured Guards Brigade (3.GOMBR).

In 2007, the 3.GOMBR itself was reformed to become the present-day Guards Armoured Mechanized Brigade (GOMBR)), a unit of mechanized infantry based in Vinkovci.

The legacy and the name of the historic brigade survives through the Tank Battalion "Kune", which is part of the modern-day GOMBR.
