= Croatian Army =

- Hrvatska Kopnena Vojska
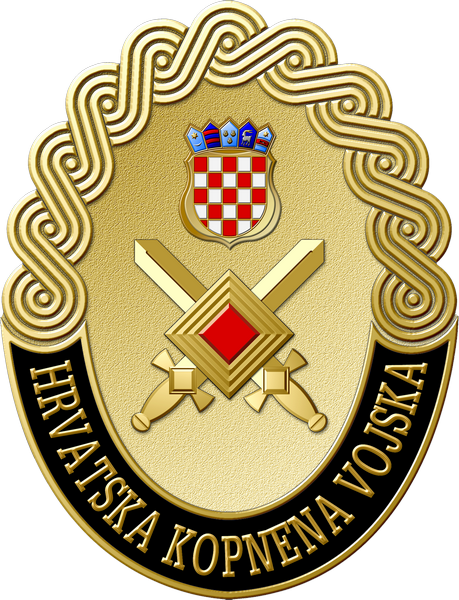
- Emblem of the Croatian Army
- Founded: 28 May 1991; 35 years ago
- Country: Croatia
- Type: Army
- Size: 7,000 (2025)
- Part of: Armed Forces of Croatia
- H/Q: Karlovac
- Mottos: "Domovini Vjerni" (Faithful to Homeland)
- March: "Mi smo Garda Hrvatska" (We are the Croatian Guard)
- Anniversaries: 28 May
- Equipment: List of equipment of the Croatian Army
- Engagements: List: Croatian War of Independence: Battle of Vukovar; Battle of the Barracks; Operation Coast-91; Siege of Dubrovnik; Operation Maslenica; Operation Winter '94; Operation Orkan 91; Battle of Zadar; Operation Otkos 10; Operation Flash; Operation Summer '95; Operation Storm Bosnian War: Croat–Bosniak War; Operation Mistral 2; Operation Southern Move War on Terror: War in Afghanistan; Iraq War
- Website: www.morh.hr/en/

Commanders
- Current commander: Major general Blaž Beretin
- Notable commanders: General Martin Špegelj, General Janko Bobetko, General Petar Stipetić, General Zvonimir Červenko, Lieutenant General Ante Gotovina, Lieutenant General Marijan Mareković, Lieutenant General Mladen Kruljac

The Croatian Army (Croatian: Hrvatska kopnena vojska or HKoV) is the land force branch of the Armed Forces of Croatia. It is the oldest and largest of its three service branches, followed by the Croatian Air Force and Croatian Navy. The Army's primary mission is to protect Croatia's territory, sovereignty, and its national interests around the world. The Croatian Army Command is primarily headquartered in Karlovac with 20 military bases nationwide.

It supports joint military operations alongside its allies and within international organizations such as NATO. It has been similarly deployed as a peacekeeping force abroad, mostly with the United Nations. Within Croatia, the Army has provided humanitarian support to citizens impacted by natural disasters. The military's first foreign deployment was to the War in Afghanistan and Iraq War in 2003 and has since deployed to a variety of multilateral missions.

These land forces are organized into combat, support, and service units, both mechanized and armored-mechanized infantry. Combat support units oversee artillery, anti-aircraft warfare, military engineering, military police, and military intelligence. It maintains a close partnership with the Croatian security and intelligence system. Since the 2010s, the Army has expanded its international cooperation and military aid programs, particularly within Europe.

== Function ==
The primary function of the Croatian Army is to defend the sovereignty and territorial integrity of the Republic of Croatia. It is responsible for conducting land operations independently or in coordination with other branches of the Croatian Armed Forces, leading combat on land, along the coast, and on the islands.

In the event of war or crisis, the HKoV serves as the backbone and main force for defending national territory and participating in operations abroad within the NATO collective defense system. During wartime, the Croatian Army is tasked with executing joint defensive and offensive operations to protect Croatia's territorial integrity and to support allied defense commitments in accordance with Article V of the North Atlantic Treaty.

=== Tasks of the Croatian Army ===
- Achieve and maintain an optimal level of readiness to deter aggression against the Republic of Croatia.
- Develop and maintain the capability to participate in joint operations and conduct defensive and offensive operations.
- Develop and maintain the ability to carry out non-traditional military tasks and respond to asymmetric threats, including terrorism, illicit trade, and smuggling of weapons of mass destruction, people, or drugs.
- Develop and maintain the capacity to participate in international military and humanitarian operations as part of multinational forces.
- Participate in international peace support operations.
- Support allied forces operating in Croatia.
- Engage in arms control activities and promote confidence- and security-building measures.
- Maintain the ability to support civil institutions during domestic crises, including disaster relief, protection, and rescue operations.
- Provide communication and information support to the Croatian Armed Forces.

== Military operations ==
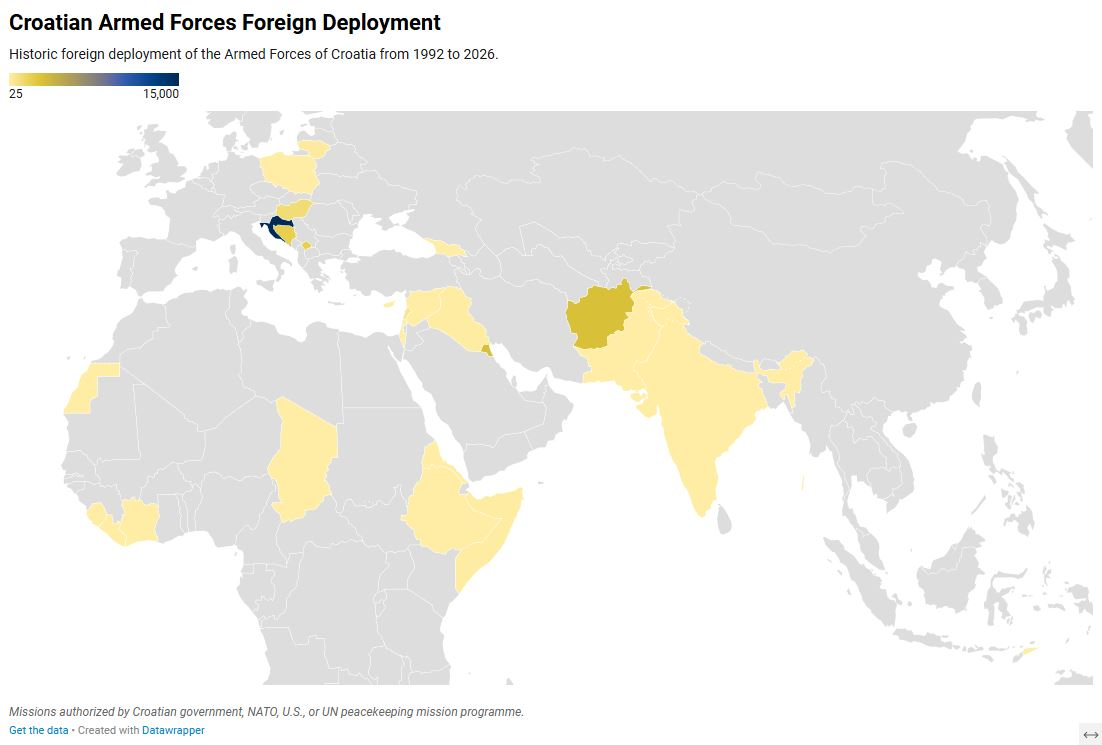
Foreign deployment of the Croatian Armed Forces abroad in military and peacekeeping missions.

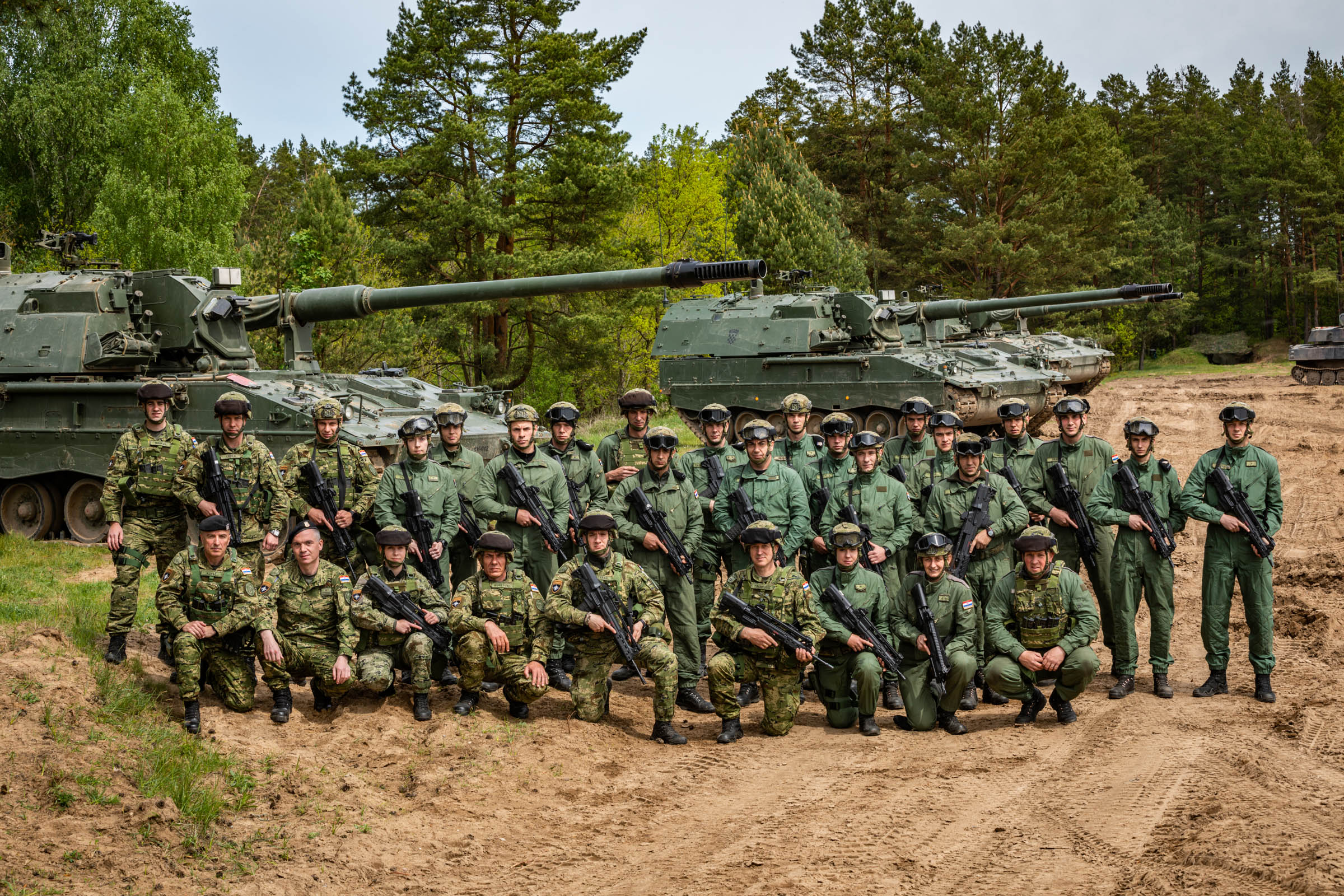
The Croatian Army during NATO EFP, 2023

The Croatian Army has been deployed around the world for military engagements, peacekeeping missions, and multilateral campaigns. Since 1999, over 6,000 Croatian troops have participated in foreign military interventions. They have deployed to a variety of NATO, UN, EU, and American-led missions in Europe, the Middle East, and Africa. The largest foreign deployment of Croatian soldiers was to NATO-led International Security Assistance Force Mission (ISAF) and its subsequent Resolute Support Mission in Afghanistan from 2003 to 2020.

=== NATO ===
Alongside the military alliance NATO, the Croatian Army has participated in the following multilateral missions:

- NATO EFP Battlegroups (Hungary, Lithuania & Poland)
- NATO International Security and Assistance Force (ISAF) (Afghanistan)
- Operation Resolute Support (RS) (Afghanistan)
- Operation Support for Peace (Kosovo)
- NATO Training Mission in Iraq (NTM-I)
- NATO Mission in Iraq (NM-I)
- Operation Sea Guardian (Mediterranean Sea)

=== European Union (EU) ===
Alongside the European Union (EU), the Croatian Army has been deployed to:

- Operation Althea (Bosnia and Herzegovina)
- EU Battlegroup(s): 2012, 2016, and 2025

=== United Nations (UN) ===
Alongside the United Nations (UN), the Croatian Army has been involved in the following UN peacekeeping missions:

- UN Mission for the Referendum in Western Sahara
- UN Interim Force in Lebanon
- UN Military Observer Group in India and Pakistan
- UN Observer Mission in Georgia
- UN Mission of Support to East Timor
- UN Mission in Sierra Leone
- UN Mission in Ethiopia and Eritrea
- UN Mission in South Sudan
- UN Mission in Liberia
- UN Mission in Cyprus

== History ==
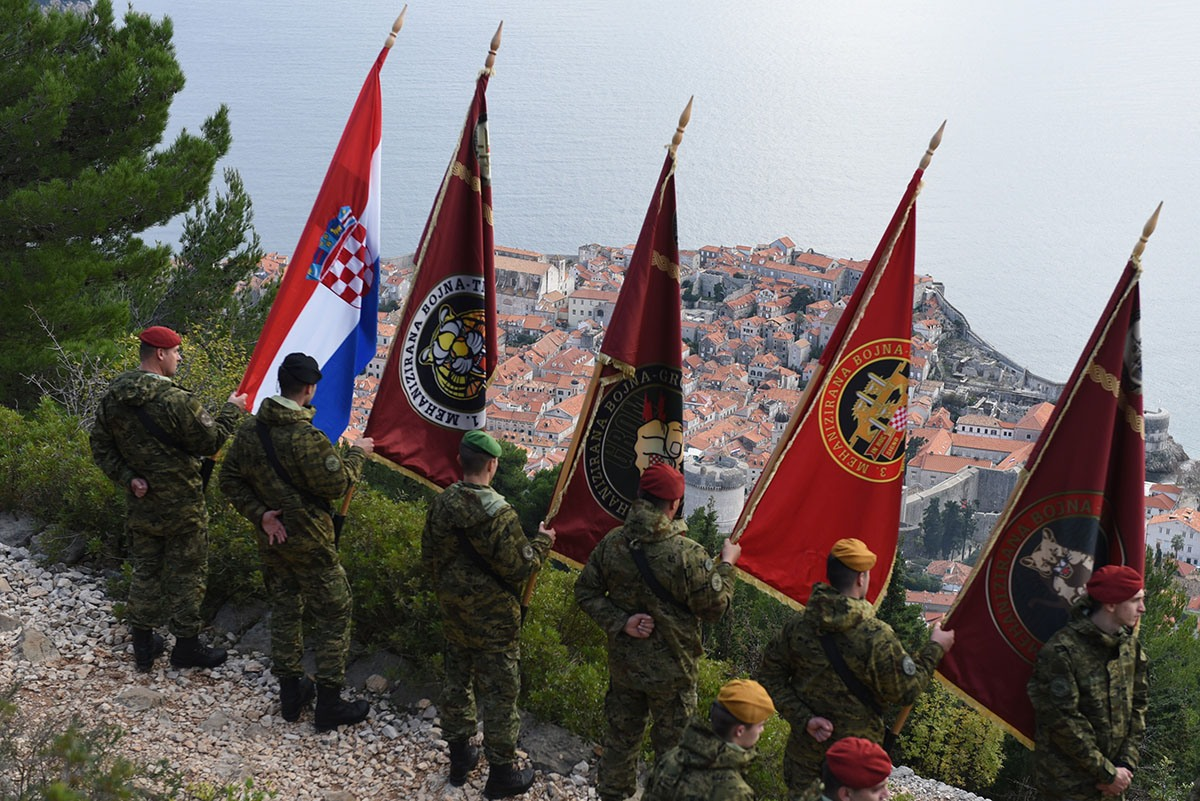
Battalion Standards of the Croatian Army, 2019

The Croatian Army celebrates its day on 28 May, commemorating the day when members of the 1st, 2nd, 3rd, and 4th brigades of the Croatian National Guard (ZNG) were lined up and sworn in at the NK Zagreb stadium on Kranjčevićeva Street in Zagreb. The formation of the first ZNG units followed the "Bloody Easter" of 1991, when it became clear that the Republic of Croatia would need organized military forces to defend itself.

The initial units of the National Guard Corps are considered the foundation of the Croatian Army's ground forces. From their active cores, the guard brigades were formed:

- 1st Guards Brigade "Tigrovi"
- 2nd Guards Brigade "Gromovi"
- 3rd Guards Brigade "Kune"
- 4th Guards Brigade "Pauci"

These brigades were the backbone of all operations carried out by the Croatian Army during the Homeland War. Alongside the reserve infantry brigades, also founded in 1991, members of the guard brigades fought in key battles across Croatia, including Vukovar, Dubrovnik, Zadar, Karlovac, Gospić, Novska, and Okučane, as well as in Posavina, Banovina, Lika, eastern Slavonia, and the southern hinterlands of Zadar, Šibenik, and Dubrovnik. Professional and reserve members of the Croatian Army played a central role in planning and executing operations such as "Spaljena Zemlja" (1992), "Maslenica" (1993), and the liberation operations of 1995 that restored the Republic of Croatia's territorial integrity. They were the main force in major operations such as "Flash", "Summer '95", and "Storm". Following the success of "Storm," operations "Mistral" and "Southern Move" further consolidated military gains. The 1995 campaigns established a regional military balance of power, compelling the opposing side to recognize Croatian military strength and ultimately facilitating the peaceful reintegration of the Croatian Danube region.

=== Units Originating from the Croatian National Guard ===
Numerous Croatian Army units trace their origins to the ZNG, including:

- 1st Croatian Guards Corps
- 1st Guards Brigade "Tigrovi"
- 2nd Guards Brigade "Gromovi"
- 3rd Guards Brigade "Kune"
- 4th Guards Brigade "Pauci"
- 7th Guards Brigade "Pume"
- Croatian 104th Brigade
- 204th Vukovar Brigade

=== 21st century ===
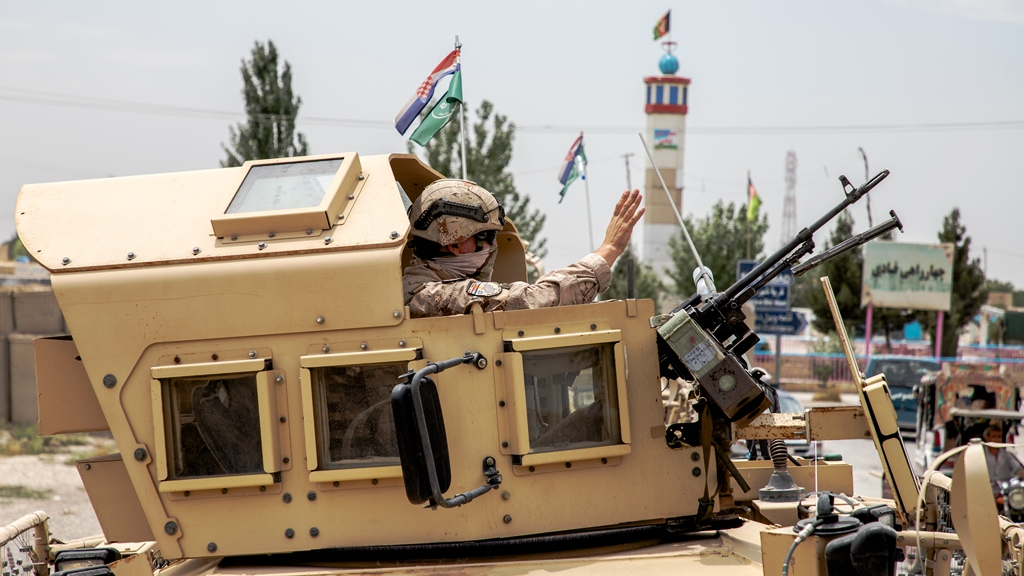
10th Croatian contingent during operation Resolute Support in Afghanistan, 2019

Following the independence of Croatia in 1990s, the Croatian Army underwent a series of reforms and modernization programs during the 2000s. The first foreign deployment of Croatian soldiers was to the NATO-led International Security Assistance Force Mission (ISAF) in 2003 within Afghanistan. Later that year, they deployed to Iraq – following the American-led invasion of Iraq – for a large-scale stabilization operation. In 2006, the Croatian military led a successful capture of a small group of Taliban rebels in the Afghani city of Kandahar. In 2007, the Croatian government professionalized their Armed Forces by waiving the year's requirement for compulsory military service. The military heavily redeployed into ISAF during the 2010s, rejoining American-led coalition forces for Resolute Support Mission. Starting in 2017, the Croatian Army joined the U.S. Army in Iraq and Kuwait for Operation Inherent Resolve for nearly a decade to deter the Islamic State of Iraq and the Levant (ISIL).

The Croatian military significantly expanded during the early 2020s due to the regional Russian invasion of Ukraine in 2022. In 2024, the Croatian Parliament redeployed soldiers to Iraq for non-combat Iraqi counterterrorism support. The Croatian Parliament reenacted military conscription in 2025. Amid the 2026 U.S.-Israeli war in Iran and the related Israeli incursion into Lebanon, the Croatian government preemptively withdrew army troops from Iraq and Lebanon.

== Organizational structure and status ==
Croatian army locations
Key: red – mech, gold – armoured

=== Operational art and tactical doctrine ===
The Army's two major combat formations are:

1. Guards Armoured Mechanized Brigade
  - 1 Tank Battalion, equipped with M-84A4 Sniper main battle tanks
  - 2 Armoured Mechanized Battalions, equipped with M-80 infantry fighting vehicles
2. Guards Mechanized Brigade
  - 3 Mechanized Battalions, equipped with Patria AMV armored personnel carriers and infantry fighting vehicles
  - 1 Motorized Battalion, equipped with Oshkosh M-ATV Mine-Resistant Ambush Protected infantry mobility Vehicles

Both brigades also include supporting units:

- 1 Artillery and Rocket Battalion
- 1 Air Defence Battalion
- 1 Engineer Battalion
- 1 Reconnaissance Company
- 1 Signals Company
- 1 Logistics Company
- 1 Command Company

To enhance readiness and integration with allied forces, the Croatian Army participates in numerous annual exercises such as "SHIELD", "Immediate Response", and "SAVA STAR", among others. It also contributes to NATO's Enhanced Forward Presence missions in Europe.

=== Reserve component of the Croatian army ===
Reserve units were a foundational element of the Croatian Army during the Homeland War. The Home Guard was restored as a separate reserve component within the Army, operating under a unique command system. After the war, the Home Guard was disbanded and demobilized, and with the 2003 reorganization of the Croatian Armed Forces, the Home Guard was officially abolished.

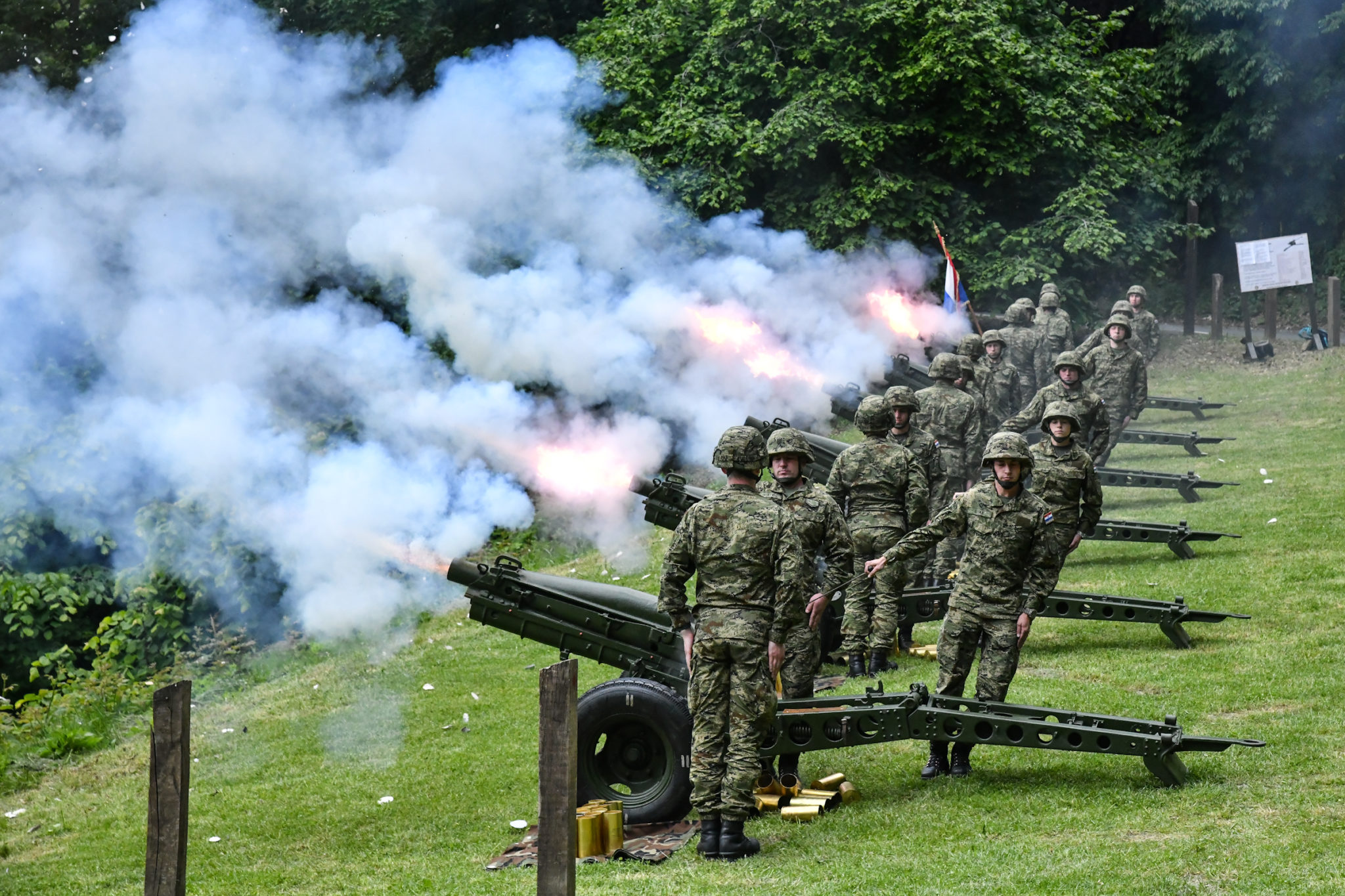
The Croatian Army during a M116 howitzer demonstration, 2020

For several years after joining NATO, Croatia maintained only active-duty units, totaling approximately 16,000 personnel. In 2014, a decision was made to re-establish the reserve component.

By 2018, twelve reserve units had been formed:

- 6 Infantry Regiments
- 2 Artillery and Rocket Regiments
- 1 Air Defence Regiment
- 1 Logistics Regiment
- 1 Engineer Battalion
- 1 Signals Battalion

In 2020, Chief of the General Staff of the Croatian Armed Forces Robert Hranj announced plans to develop an operational reserve, consisting of smaller, highly trained units with a high state of readiness. These units are intended to perform a wide range of tasks, from supporting civilian institutions throughout Croatia to engaging in combat operations.

== Land Forces Command organization ==
- Land Forces Command, in Karlovac
  - Signals Battalion, in Velika Gorica
  - CBRN Defence Battalion, in Velika Gorica
  - Guards Armored-Mechanized Brigade, in Vinkovci
    - Command Company, in Vinkovci
    - Tank Battalion "Kune", in Đakovo
    - 1st Mechanized Battalion "Sokolovi", in Našice
    - 2nd Mechanized Battalion "Pume", in Varaždin
    - Artillery and Rocket Battalion, in Bjelovar
    - Air Defence Battalion, in Vinkovci
    - Engineer Battalion, in Vukovar
    - Reconnaissance Company, in Vinkovci
    - Signals Company, in Vinkovci
    - Logistics Company, in Vinkovci
  - Guards Mechanized Brigade, in Knin
    - Command Company, in Knin
    - 1st Mechanized Battalion "Tigrovi", in Petrinja
    - 2nd Mechanized Battalion "Gromovi", in Petrinja
    - 3rd Mechanized Battalion "Pauci", in Knin
    - Motorized Battalion "Vukovi", in Gospić
    - Artillery and Rocket Battalion, in Slunj
    - Air Defence Battalion, in Benkovac
    - Engineer Battalion, in Sinj
    - Reconnaissance Company, in Knin
    - Signals Company, in Knin
    - Logistics Company, in Knin
  - Artillery & Rocket Regiment, in Bjelovar
    - Command Battalion, in Bjelovar
    - Self-Propelled Howitzer Battalion, in Bjelovar
    - Rocket Battalion, in Bjelovar
    - Logistics Company, in Bjelovar
  - Air Defence Regiment, in Zadar
    - Command Battery, in Zemunik Donji
    - 1st Mixed Battalion, in Zemunik Donji
    - 2nd Mixed Battalion, in Udbina
    - 3rd Mixed Battalion, in Zagreb
  - Engineer Regiment, in Karlovac
    - Command Company, in Karlovac
    - Engineer Battalion, in Karlovac
    - River Battalion, in Osijek
  - Training and Doctrine Command, in Osijek
    - Headquarters Support Unit, in Osijek
    - Infantry and Armor Training Center, in Gašinci and Požega
    - Combat Training Center, in Slunj
    - Simulation Center, in Zagreb
    - Leader Development Center "Marko Babić", in Udbina
    - International Military Operations Center ''Josip Briški'', in Rakitje
    - Reserve Component:
      - 1st Infantry Regiment, in Zagreb
      - 2nd Infantry Regiment, in Osijek
      - 3rd Infantry Regiment, in Karlovac
      - 4th Infantry Regiment, in Pula
      - 5th Infantry Regiment, in Split
      - 6th Infantry Regiment, in Dubrovnik
      - 2nd Artillery and Rocket Regiment, in Knin
    - Training grounds:
      - Eugen Kvaternik Training Grounds, in Slunj
      - Crvena Zemlja Training Grounds, in Knin
      - Gašinci Training Grounds, in Đakovo

=== Land Forces Command organization graphic ===
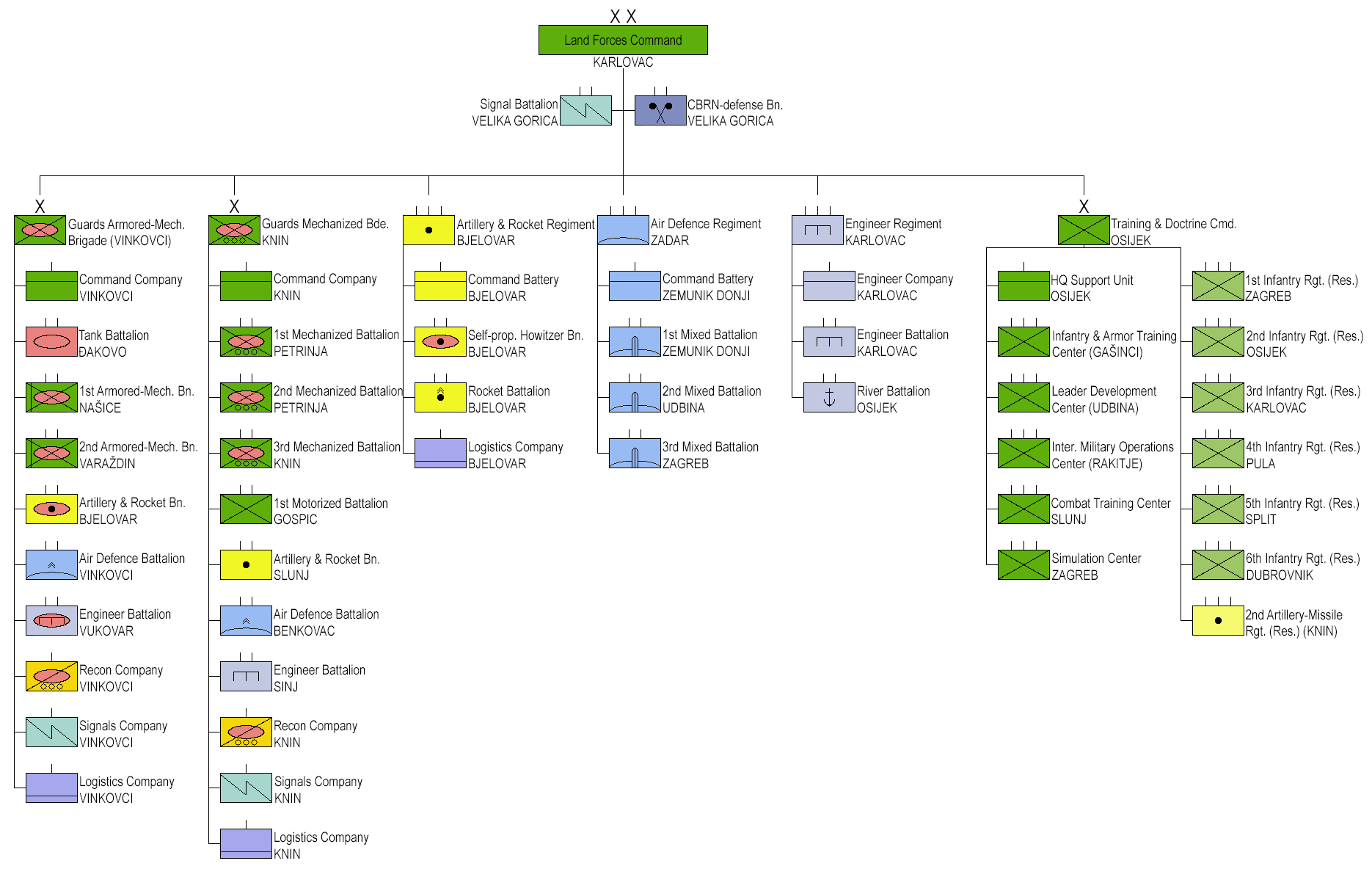
Land Forces Command organization as of April 2026 (click image to enlarge)

== Military assets ==
The Croatian Army maintains a variety of military assets, including weapons, vehicles, aircraft, drones, ships, technology, radar systems, and infrastructure. Croatia has a robust defence industrial base due to its close partnership with the European Union and United States. The Croatian Army has some of the following military assets: 650 AFVs, around 150 pieces of artillery, 105 MLRSs, 75 tanks, and 25 SPGs. Following the 2022 Zagreb Tu-141 crash, the Croatian military promptly acquired surface-to-air missile (SAM) air defence systems Mistral and VL MICA. From 2024 to 2025, it purchased 50 Leopard 2A8 from Germany as well as additional Black Hawk helicopters, eight HIMARS rocket launchers and 89 Bradley M2A2 tanks from the United States.

== See also ==
- List of Croatian soldiers
- Military history of Croatia
