= Operation Spreča 95 =

Attack by the VRS in the Bosnian War

Operation Spreča '95
- Part of the Bosnian War
Date	March–May 1995
Location	Teočak, Sapna, Vitinica, Kalesija and surrounding areas, Bosnia and Herzegovina
Result	ARBiH defensive victory

Belligerents
Army of Republika Srpska	Army of the Republic of Bosnia and Herzegovina

Commanders and leaders
Ratko Mladić	

Units involved
East Bosnia Corps; Drina Corps	2nd Corps; 24th Division; 25th division

Operation Spreča '95 was a VRS offensive operation conducted in the spring of 1995 during the Bosnian War. The operation was primarily planned and conducted by the East Bosnia Corps of the VRS, with the participation of forces from the Drina Corps, against positions of the Army of the Republic of Bosnia and Herzegovina (ARBiH) in the wider area of Teočak, Sapna, Vitinica and the Kalesija–Simin Han direction.

== Background ==
By early 1995, the eastern and northeastern parts of the Republika Srpska front were threatened by the continued presence of ARBiH-held areas around Teočak and Sapna. The area represented a salient into territory controlled by the VRS and was located near important communications and strategic approaches towards the Drina valley and northeastern Bosnia. The operation formed part of the VRS's wider offensive planning for the spring of 1995. According to VRS operational directives, the immediate objective was to cut off ARBiH forces in the area of Teočak and Sapna, destroy them, and remove the threat of an ARBiH breakthrough towards the Drina north of Zvornik. The operation was also intended to create favourable conditions for the subsequent strategic operation Sadejstvo '95, which envisioned broader offensive action against the 2nd Corps and advances towards Tuzla and Živinice. The VRS directive assigned the East Bosnia Corps responsibility for planning and conducting Spreča '95 in coordination with the Drina Corps.

== Operation ==
The operation began during a period of heightened military activity along the northeastern front in the spring of 1995. The operation was launched at the same time the Army of the Republic of Bosnia and Herzegovina (ARBiH) made its last attempt to take Stolice. The VRS East Bosnian and Drina Corps had launched the operation against the southeastern side of the salient by 4 April, although it might have started in late March. On 23 May, VRS forces prepared for an offensive along the salient. On 25 May, the operation was launched at 5:00 am. VRS attacked ARBiH positions in the area of Teočak and Sapna while attempting to cut the salient off the surrounding ARBiH-held territory. The VRS objective was to isolate the ARBiH forces in the Teočak–Sapna area and subsequently destroy them. The operation also sought to secure approaches that would enable further offensive operations towards the Kalesija and Tuzla areas. The operation was conducted in difficult terrain and during adverse weather conditions. An officer who participated in the operation later testified that VRS forces made advances in some areas but were forced to withdraw from certain positions because of the cold weather and difficulties in maintaining their positions. The same testimony described the operation as well organised but affected by operational difficulties and incomplete participation by some formations.

The main fighting took place around the ARBiH-held areas of Teočak and Sapna and the surrounding villages and high ground. The VRS attempted to penetrate and sever the defensive system connecting the area with the wider ARBiH-held territory. The VRS plan envisaged the destruction of the ARBiH forces in the salient and the creation of conditions for a continuation of the offensive towards the Kalesija–Simin Han direction and, ultimately, towards Tuzla. Despite VRS attacks and local advances, the ARBiH maintained its defensive positions in the area. Fighting continued during April and into May 1995. The operation was subsequently incorporated into the broader strategic context of the VRS's spring offensive planning.

== Outcome ==
The operation did not achieve its strategic objectives. VRS forces were unable to destroy the ARBiH forces defending the Teočak–Sapna area or establish the planned operational line towards the Kalesija and Tuzla area. Fighting continued through the spring of 1995 and the operation was ultimately followed by the wider VRS offensive known as Sadejstvo '95 which sought to coordinate offensive action by several VRS corps and create conditions for advances towards the Tuzla region..

== See also ==
- Bosnian War
- Army of Republika Srpska
- Army of the Republic of Bosnia and Herzegovina
- 2nd Corps of the Army of the Republic of Bosnia and Herzegovina
- Teočak
- Sapna
