= Sarajevo-Romanija Corps =

Sarajevo-Romanija Corps Сарајевско-романијски корпус
- Active: 22 May 1992 – 1996
- Country: Republika Srpska
- Allegiance: Army of Republika Srpska
- Branch: Ground Forces
- Type: Mechanized; Mountain; Armoured
- Role: The protection of the central parts of Republika Srpska
- Size: 23,000
- Garrison/HQ: Pale
- Anniversaries: 22 May
- Engagements: Bosnian War: Siege of Sarajevo; Battle of Azići; Operation Lukavac '93; 1995 Pale air strikes; Operation Tekbir '95; Other operations

Commanders
- Commander: Tomislav Šipčić (1992); Stanislav Galić (1992–94); Dragomir Milošević (1994–1996)

Sarajevo-Romanija Corps (Serbian: Сарајевско-романијски корпус, Sarajevsko-romanijski korpus) was one of the six corps of the Army of Republika Srpska (VRS), established on 22 May 1992. Before implementation into the Army of Republika Srpska, the corps was known as 4th Sarajevo Corps of Yugoslav People's Army. Commanders of the corps were Tomislav Šipčić, Stanislav Galić and Dragomir Milošević. The corps numbered 23,000 soldiers. During the War in Bosnia and Herzegovina around 4,000 soldiers died.

== Organization ==
The headquarters of the Sarajevo-Romanija Corps was in Pale. Responsibility zone of the Sarajevo-Romanija Corps was determined by Nišići, Ilijaš, Hadžići, Vogošća, Istočno Sarajevo, Ilidža, Treskavica and Goražde, over 150 km^{2} of front (1993). Sarajevo-Romanija Corps participated in operations Ilidža, Lukavica, Sedrenik, Tekbir and more.

== Sarajevo–Romanija Corps Units ==
=== Brigades ===
- 1st Sarajevo Mechanized Brigade, HQ Lukavica
- 2nd Sarajevo Light Infantry Brigade, HQ Vojkovići
- 3rd Sarajevo Infantry Brigade, HQ Vogošća
- 4th Sarajevo Light Infantry Brigade, HQ Pale
- 1st Romanija Infantry Brigade, HQ Han Pijesak
- 1st Ilijaš Infantry Brigade, HQ Ilijaš
- 1st Ilidža Infantry Brigade, HQ Ilidža
- 1st Igman Infantry Brigade, HQ Hadžići

=== Other Units ===
- 4th Reconnaissance-Sabotage Detachment “White Wolves”, HQ Pale
- 4th Military Police Battalion, HQ Lukavica
- 4th Communications Battalion, HQ Lukavica
- 4th Mixed Antitank Artillery Regiment, HQ Lukavica
- 4th Mixed Artillery Regiment, HQ Lukavica
- 4th Light Air Defence Artillery Regiment, HQ Lukavica
- 4th Engineer Battalion, HQ Pale
- 4th Auto-transport Battalion, HQ Lukavica
- 4th Medical Battalion, HQ Pale
