= Momir Talić =

Bosnian Serb general (1942-2003)

- Born: 15 July 1942; Piskavica, Independent State of Croatia (now Piskavica, Bosnia and Herzegovina)
- Died: 28 May 2003 (aged 60)
- Military career
- Allegiance: Republika Srpska
- Branch: Army of Republika Srpska
- Rank: Chief of Staff (JNA 5th Corps); Commander (1st Krajina Corps)
- Units: JNA 5th Corps; 1st Krajina Corps
- Conflicts: Bosnian War; 1992 Yugoslav campaign in Bosnia; Battle of Kupres 92; Operation Vrbas '92; Operation Corridor 92; Operation Corridor 93; Battle of Azići; Operation Sadejstvo; Operation "Breza '94"; Battle of Orašje; Operation Una

Momir Talić (15 July 1942 – 28 May 2003) was a Bosnian Serb general in the Yugoslav People's Army and later the Army of Republika Srpska.

== Military career ==
Talić was the Chief of Staff of the JNA 5th Corps in Banja Luka as of 26 July 1991. He was promoted to Commander of the same corps, which was renamed 1st Krajina Corps of the Republika Srpska Army (VRS) on 19 March 1992. In the aftermath of the breakup of Yugoslavia, Republika Srpska was one of many states established. Territorial and other conflicts between the new states led to the Bosnian War.

== Trial for war crimes ==
Talić was indicted on 14 March 1999 for war crimes, including genocide, torture and wanton destruction. He was arrested on 25 August 1999 in Austria. He pleaded not guilty to all the charges against him.

Talić was initially tried with Radoslav Brđanin, a politician and President of the ARK Crisis Staff, but the trials were separated on 20 September 2002 due to Talić's ill health. Talić died in Belgrade on 28 May 2003.

Military offices
| Preceded by Pero Čolić | Chief of the General Staff of the Army of Republika Srpska; 1998–1999 | Succeeded by Novica Simić |
