= Operation Vrbas '92 =

Military offensive by the Army of Republika Srpska during the Bosnian War

Coordinates: 44.340287°N 17.271813°E

- Part of the Bosnian War
- Jajce and nearby towns on the map of Bosnia and Herzegovina
Date	June 1992 – 29 October 1992
Location	Jajce, Bosnia and Herzegovina
Result	Army of Republika Srpska victory: Republika Srpska retains control over Jajce

Belligerents
Republika Srpska	Republic of Bosnia and Herzegovina (Croatian Republic of Herzeg-Bosnia) Herzeg-Bosnia

Commanders and leaders
(Republika Srpska) Momir Talić (Republika Srpska) Stanislav Galić (Republika Srpska) Dragan Marčetić	(Croatian Republic of Herzeg-Bosnia) Tihomir Blaškić (Croatian Republic of Herzeg-Bosnia) Stjepan Blažević (Bosnia and Herzegovina) Midhat Karadžić

Units involved
Army of Republika Srpska: 1st Krajina Corps; Prnjavor Brigade	Croatian Defence Council; Army of the Republic of Bosnia and Herzegovina

Strength
7,000–8,000 troops	3,400–5,500 troops

Casualties and losses
Unknown	103 killed 492 wounded 5 missing
- 30,000–40,000 refugees

Operation Vrbas '92 (Serbian: Операција Врбас '92) was a military offensive undertaken by the Army of Republika Srpska (Vojska Republike Srpske – VRS) in June–October 1992, during the Bosnian War. The goal of the operation was the destruction of a salient around the central Bosnian town of Jajce, which was held by the Croatian Defence Council (Hrvatsko vijeće obrane – HVO) and the Army of the Republic of Bosnia and Herzegovina (Armija Republike Bosne i Hercegovine – ARBiH). The intensity of fighting varied considerably and involved several major VRS offensive efforts interspersed by relative lulls in fighting. Jajce fell to the VRS on 29 October 1992, and the town's capture was followed by the destruction of all its mosques and Roman Catholic churches.

The fighting improved the safety of VRS lines of communication south of the Bosnian Serb capital of Banja Luka, and displaced between 30,000 and 40,000 people, in what foreign observers called "the largest and most wretched single exodus" of the Bosnian War. The ARBiH and HVO in Jajce were not only outnumbered and outgunned, but their units were also plagued by inadequate staff work, compounded by lack of coordination between separate command and control structures maintained by the two forces throughout the battle. The defence of Jajce also suffered from worsening Croat–Bosniak relations and skirmishes between the ARBiH and the HVO along the resupply route to Jajce. Ultimately, the outcome of the battle itself fueled greater Bosniak–Croat animosities, which eventually led to the Croat–Bosniak War. The VRS saw the cracking of the ARBiH–HVO alliance as a very significant outcome of the operation.

== Background ==
As the Yugoslav People's Army (Jugoslovenska narodna armija – JNA) withdrew from Croatia following the acceptance and start of implementation of the Vance plan, its 55,000 officers and soldiers born in Bosnia and Herzegovina were transferred to a new Bosnian Serb army, which was later renamed the Army of Republika Srpska (Vojska Republike Srpske – VRS). This reorganisation followed the declaration of the Serbian Republic of Bosnia and Herzegovina on 9 January 1992, ahead of the 29 February – 1 March 1992 referendum on the independence of Bosnia and Herzegovina. This declaration would later be cited by the Bosnian Serbs as a pretext for the Bosnian War. On 4 April, JNA artillery began shelling Sarajevo. At the same time, the JNA and the Bosnian Serb forces clashed with the HVO at the Kupres Plateau, capturing Kupres by 7 April.

The JNA and the VRS in Bosnia and Herzegovina faced the Army of the Republic of Bosnia and Herzegovina (Armija Republike Bosne i Hercegovine – ARBiH) and the Croatian Defence Council (Hrvatsko vijeće obrane – HVO), reporting to the Bosniak-dominated central government and the Bosnian Croat leadership respectively, as well as the Croatian Army (Hrvatska vojska – HV), which occasionally supported HVO operations. In late April, the VRS was able to deploy 200,000 troops, hundreds of tanks, armoured personnel carriers (APCs) and artillery pieces. The HVO and the Croatian Defence Forces (Hrvatske obrambene snage – HOS) could field approximately 25,000 soldiers and a handful of heavy weapons, while the ARBiH was largely unprepared with nearly 100,000 troops, small arms for less than a half of their number and virtually no heavy weapons. Arming of the various forces was hampered by a UN arms embargo introduced in September 1991. By mid-May 1992, when those JNA units which had not been transferred to the VRS withdrew from Bosnia and Herzegovina to the newly declared Federal Republic of Yugoslavia, the VRS controlled approximately 60 percent of Bosnia and Herzegovina.

Even though the Graz agreement, negotiated by Bosnian Serbs and Bosnian Croats aiming to partition Bosnia and Herzegovina in early May, proclaimed cessation of hostilities between the two groups, heavy fighting broke out between the HVO and the VRS in June, in eastern Herzegovina (Operation Jackal), and in the Sava River basin (Operation Corridor 92), in the north of Bosnia and Herzegovina.

== Timeline ==
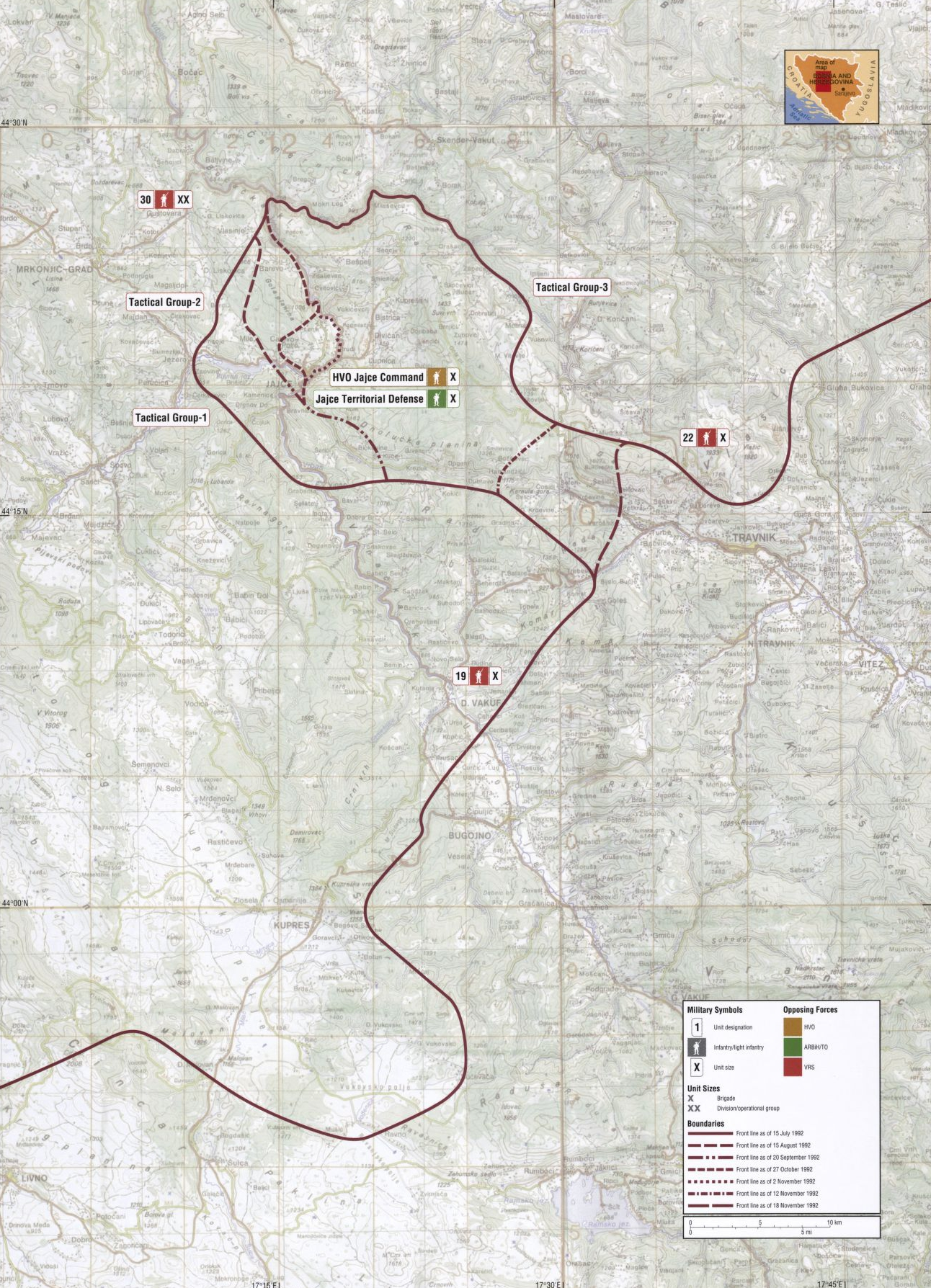
Map of Operation Vrbas '92

While the fighting related to Operation Corridor 92 was still in progress, the VRS prepared to attack and destroy a salient around the town of Jajce in central part of Bosnia and Herzegovina, held jointly by the HVO and the ARBiH. The salient threatened Bosnian Serb lines of communication south of VRS-held Banja Luka and contained two hydroelectric power plants critical for electrical supply of Banja Luka region. The salient was held by between 3,400 and 5,500 HVO and ARBiH troops manning strong fortifications in difficult terrain. The VRS committed 7,000–8,000 troops of the 30th Infantry Division of the 1st Krajina Corps to the offensive codenamed Operation Vrbas '92. The 30th Division was under command of Colonel Stanislav Galić, until he was replaced by Colonel Dragan Marčetić in early September. The VRS troops included the 1st, 11th and 17th Light Infantry Brigades and 1st Mixed Antitank Artillery Battalion. Besides the numerical superiority, the VRS held a clear advantage in armour, deploying 20–30 tanks and adding 30–50 heavy artillery pieces to the force. Defence of Jajce was organised at municipal crisis headquarters level by mayor Midhat Karadžić, while the HVO force in Jajce was commanded by Stjepan Blažević.

=== Initial combat ===
The Jajce salient was supported via a 40-kilometre (25 mi) road running through a narrow corridor to the town of Travnik. In July, the VRS attempted to cut the supply corridor and isolate Jajce from Travnik before any effort was made to capture the salient, but the attacks failed to accomplish any significant headway. This prompted the VRS to switch to a gradual advance along three separate axes converging on Jajce directly instead. The move was designed to minimize VRS casualties and allow a systematic elimination of HVO and ARBiH defences around the town. ARBiH-HVO successfully defended Jajce from the VRS, in part thanks to the area's mountainous surroundings. In the same month, feuding between the Croatian Democratic Union (HDZ) and the Party of Democratic Action (SDA) over political control began and the HVO forcibly disbanded the Bosniak-led war presidency in Jajce in exchange for one that was pro-Croat.

The VRS launched the first major attack along the western approach to Jajce in mid-August. The attack pushed through the town's defences and the VRS arrived to within two kilometres (1.2 miles) of Jajce. After this breakthrough, the frontline stabilised for nearly a month before the VRS made another push towards Jajce. The advance came from the southwest of the town and the defenders were pushed back to within one kilometre (0.62 miles) from the town. In order to relieve Jajce, the ARBiH and the HVO launched a joint attack north of Bugojno and Novi Travnik against a flank of the VRS force attacking Jajce, but the offensive failed—gaining no ground at all and hardly making any impact on the VRS deployments around Jajce. The VRS continued shelling Jajce and started small-scale airstrikes in the area. That led the United Nations (UN) to declare the whole of Bosnia and Herzegovina a no-fly zone. A Central Intelligence Agency (CIA) analysis concluded that it is possible that the failure of the ARBiH–HVO counterattack prompted the HVO to agree on a short-lived truce with the VRS in early October. Besides a ceasefire, the agreement promised the Bosnian Serbs power supply from the hydroelectric power plants in Jajce salient if the Serbs stopped their offensive.

=== The final attack ===
Relations between the ARBiH and the HVO deteriorated in the area of nearby town of Prozor, and Novi Travnik in late summer. The strained relations escalated rapidly and led to an armed clash between the two forces in Novi Travnik on 18 October. Low-scale conflicts spread in the region, and the two forces engaged each other along the supply route to Jajce three days later, on 21 October, as a result of an ARBiH roadblock set up the previous day on authority of the "Coordinating Committee for the Protection of Muslims" rather than the ARBiH command. Just as the roadblock was dismantled, a new skirmish occurred in the town of Vitez the following day. The developments also meant that supply of ammunition for Jajce defenders was unable to move further than Prozor, and prompted the commander of the HVO Central Bosnia Operational Zone Colonel Tihomir Blaškić to consider pulling a part of the HVO troops from Jajce to reopen the Jajce–Prozor route. Blaškić's position was weakened by the HVO headquarters since 18 October, when a quarter of heavy weapons at his disposal were removed to Čapljina, ahead of HV's Operation Vlaštica aimed at Dubrovnik hinterland. The overall poor situation culminated in the Battle of Prozor fought between the HVO and the ARBiH. The battle began on 23 October, just after the United Nations Protection Force (UNPROFOR) managed to calm the situation in Vitez and Novi Travnik. End of fighting in and around Prozor was arranged on 26 October, coming into effect two days later.

The VRS seized the opportunity to launch a fresh advance towards Jajce amid ARBiH–HVO clashes, attacking along three axes towards the town on 25 October. Putting their conflict aside, the HVO and the ARBiH deployed in Jajce fought back for four days before the VRS entered the town on 29 October. As the VRS capture of the town appeared inevitable, the defending force pulled out. Following its capture, Serb radio and television declared Jajce a "liberated town" and a part of "the free Serbian republic".

== Aftermath ==
=== Exodus and destruction of religious sites ===
After the VRS entered Jajce, the HVO and the ARBiH pulled out from the remainder of the salient towards Travnik. They were joined by the civilian population of Jajce, forming a column of between 30,000 and 40,000 refugees that stretched 16 kilometres (10 miles), and among which thousands were vulnerable to VRS sniping and shelling. Foreign observers described this as "the largest and most wretched single exodus" of the Bosnian War. Upon their arrival in Travnik, the refugees were attended to by UNHCR staff assisted by UNPROFOR troops. At least seven died at the Travnik hospital, while about 60 were treated for injuries. Approximately 20,000 Bosniak refugees from Jajce were resettled in central Bosnia, providing manpower for several new ARBiH brigades. Croat refugees headed toward Croatia due to rising tensions between Bosniaks and Croats in central Bosnia and overcrowding in Travnik. By November the pre-war population of Jajce had shrunk from 45,000 to just several thousand. Bosniaks had previously accounted for 39 percent of the population, Croats 35 percent, and Serbs 19 percent.

In the weeks following its capture, all of the mosques and Roman Catholic churches in Jajce were demolished as retribution for the HVO's destruction of the town's only Serbian Orthodox monastery in mid-October. The VRS converted the town's Franciscan monastery into a prison and its archives, museum collections and artworks were looted; the monastery church was completely destroyed. By 1992, all religious buildings in Jajce had been destroyed, save for two mosques whose perilous positioning on a hilltop made them unsuitable for demolition.

=== Legacy ===
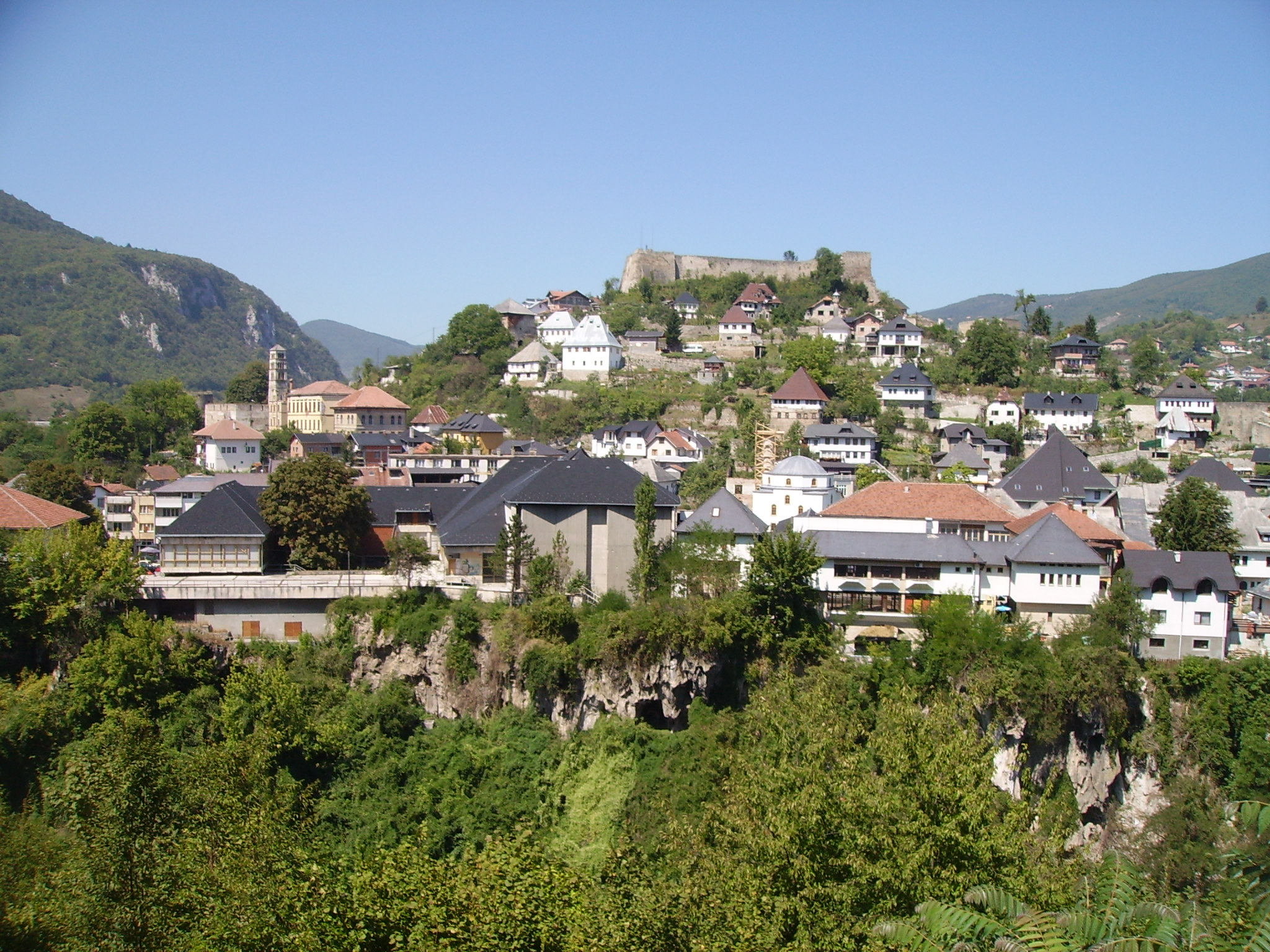
Jajce town centre

While the conflict between the HVO and the ARBiH contributed to the weakening defence of Jajce, the military superiority of the VRS was the principal reason behind the town's capture. Besides the advantage in troop size and firepower, VRS staff work and planning was significantly superior to the organisational efforts of the defenders of Jajce. The principal problem for the defence of Jajce was that the town was defended by two separate command structures, one having authority over ARBiH troops and the other over HVO units.

Humanitarian workers and foreign military observers had suspicions that the Croats deliberately abandoned Jajce, as well as territories lost in Operation Corridor 92, to the VRS in exchange for the Prevlaka Peninsula south of Dubrovnik. Even though Croatia and several Western diplomats denied this claim, European Community envoy David Owen urged the UN to impose sanctions against Croatia. The suspicion was fueled by an October 1992 agreement between Croatian President Franjo Tuđman and Yugoslav President Dobrica Ćosić to withdraw the JNA from Prevlaka. However, the JNA withdrawal from Croatian soil had also been a part of the Vance plan, which was accepted by both Croatia and Yugoslavia.

It is unclear who pulled out of Jajce first and it remains a point of "mutual recrimination". Bosniaks complained that the HVO was to blame for the loss of Jajce since its units were the first to pull out when the VRS entered the town. Conversely, the Bosnian Croat leader, Božo Raić, publicly complained about the conduct of the ARBiH in central Bosnia, blaming extremists among the ARBiH personnel for hindering the resupply of Jajce. His stance was reflected in the Croatian daily Večernji list. The newspaper assumed a confrontational position regarding Bosniaks while maintaining that the Bosniak leadership was not entirely anti-Croat. Croat–Bosniak relations gradually deteriorated, leading to the Croat–Bosniak War in 1993. In October 1993, VRS Major General Momir Talić, commander of the 1st Krajina Corps during Operation Vrbas '92, said that the capture of Jajce was the first step in dismantling of the alliance between the Bosnian Croats and Bosniaks. The Croat–Bosniak rift would not be mended before the Washington Agreement signed in March 1994, but not completely. After the HVO recaptured Jajce in the HV-led Operation Mistral 2 on 13 September 1995, the town was Croatised, and Bosniak refugees were not allowed to return. By 1998, most Croat refugees had returned to Jajce, while only 5,000 Bosniaks did so.

The ARBiH and HVO lost 103 soldiers defending Jajce; a further 492 were wounded and five remain missing. In 2008, the Prosecutor's Office of Bosnia and Herzegovina indicted two members of the VRS for war crimes committed against Bosniaks in September 1992, citing the killing of 23 Bosniak civilians and wounding of a number of others. In 2010, the Prosecutor's Office began an investigation against seven members of the ARBiH, HVO, and HOS on suspicion that they committed war crimes between 27 May and 29 October 1992 against 35 Serb civilians, including the murder of at least 15.
