= East Bosnia Corps =

East Bosnia Corps Источнобосански корпус
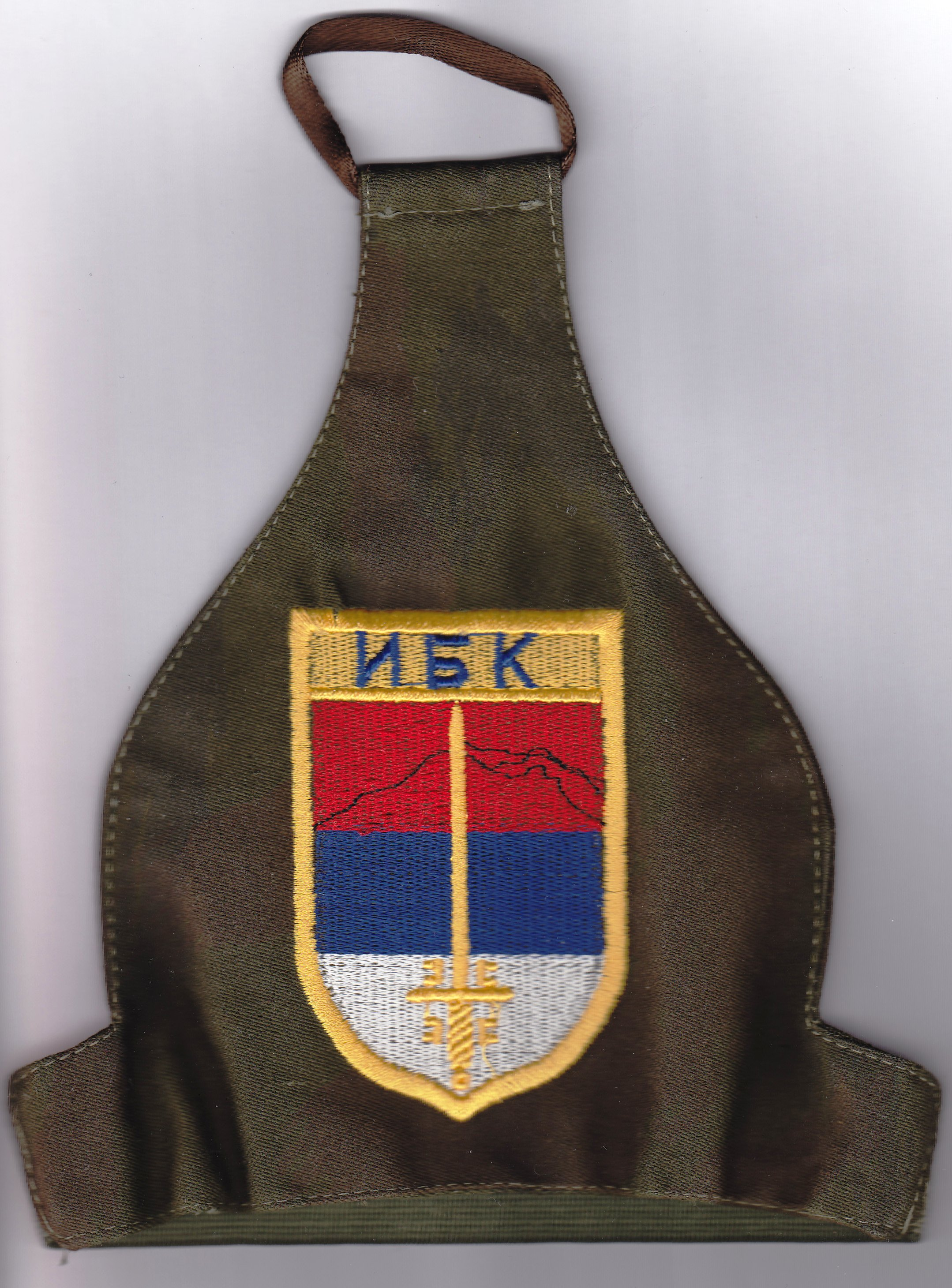
- Emblem of the East Bosnian Corps
- Active: 22 May 1992 – 1996
- Country: Republika Srpska
- Allegiance: Army of Republika Srpska
- Branch: Ground Forces
- Type: Motorized; Mountain; Armoured
- Role: The protection of the northeastern parts of Republika Srpska
- Size: 26,000
- Garrison/HQ: Bijeljina
- Anniversaries: 22 May
- Engagements: Bosnian War: Siege of Srebrenica; Siege of Goražde; Siege of Žepa; Operation Corridor 92; Operation Corridor 93; Operation Lukavac '93; Operation Sadejstvo; Operation Shield 94; Assault on Majevica; Other operations

Commanders
- Commander: Novica Simić (1992–1996)
- Ceremonial chief: Budimir Gavrić (1992–1996)

East Bosnia Corps (Serbian: Источнобосански корпус, Istočnobosanski korpus) was one of the six corps of the Army of Republika Srpska (VRS), established on 22 May 1992. Before implementation into the Army of Republika Srpska, the corps was known as 17th Tuzla Corps of Yugoslav People's Army. Commander of the corps from the start until the end of the Bosnian War was Major general Novica Simić. The corps numbered 26,000 soldiers in total. During the War in Bosnia and Herzegovina around 1,886 have been killed or missing, and 5,306 soldiers were wounded.

== Organization ==
The headquarters of the East Bosnia Corps was in Bijeljina. Responsibility zone of the East Bosnia Corps was determined by Sapna, Glinje, Priboj, Majevica, Čelić and Brčko, Pelagićevo, over 120 km² of front. East Bosnia Corps participated in operations Corridor, Sadejstvo, Majevica and more.

== East Bosnia Corps Units ==
=== Brigades ===
- 1st Bijeljina Light Infantry Brigade – "Panthers", HQ Bijeljina
  (Commander: Ljubiša Savić Mauzer)
- 1st Posavina Infantry Brigade, HQ Brčko
- 2nd Posavina Light Infantry Brigade, HQ Bosanski Šamac
- 3rd Posavina Light Infantry Brigade, HQ Pelagićevo
- 1st Semberija Light Infantry Brigade, HQ Bijeljina
- 2nd Semberija Light Infantry Brigade, HQ Bijeljina
- 3rd Semberija Light Infantry Brigade, HQ Bijeljina
- 1st Majevica Light Infantry Brigade, HQ Ugljevik
- 2nd Majevica Light Infantry Brigade, HQ Ugljevik
- 3rd Majevica Infantry Brigade, HQ Lopare

=== Other units ===
- 3rd Military Police Battalion, HQ Bijeljina
- 3rd Communications Battalion, HQ Bijeljina
- 3rd Mixed Antitank Artillery Regiment, HQ Donje Polje
- 3rd Mixed Artillery Regiment, HQ Bijeljina
- 3rd Light Air Defence Artillery Regiment, HQ Vukosavci
- 3rd Engineer Regiment, HQ Dvorovi
- 3rd Pontoon Engineer Battalion, HQ Bijeljina
- 3rd Auto-transport Battalion, HQ Bijeljina
- 3rd Medical Battalion, HQ Bijeljina
