= Operation Sadejstvo =

1993 operation of the Bosnian War

Sadejstvo '93
- Part of the Bosnian War
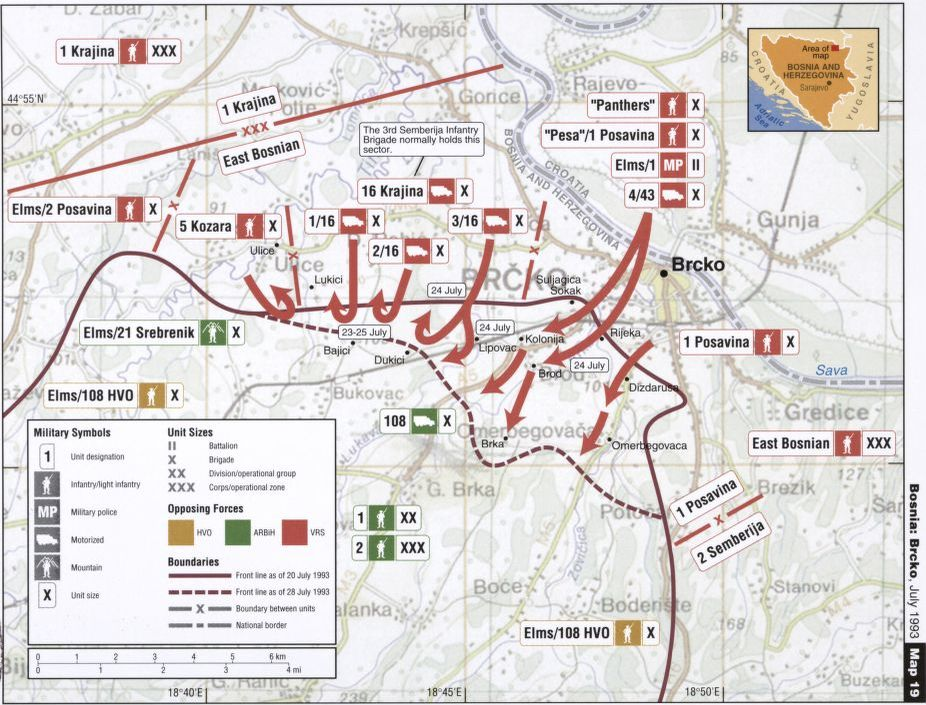
- Operation Sadejstvo '93
Date	20–27 July 1993.
Location	Bosanska Posavina, Brčko, Bosnia and Herzegovina
Result	Army of Republika Srpska victory: Bosnian Serb forces successfully expanded the corridor and captured several settlements

Belligerents
Republika Srpska	Bosnia and Herzegovina

Commanders and leaders
(Republika Srpska) Momir Talić (Republika Srpska) Novica Simić	Unknown

Units involved
Army of Republika Srpska; 1st Krajina Corps; 16th Krajina Motorized Brigade; Garda Panteri	Army of the Republic of Bosnia and Herzegovina: 2nd Corps

Strength
10,000	12,000

Casualties and losses
Unknown	Unknown

Operation "Sadejstvo ’93" was a military offensive carried out by the Army of Republika Srpska (VRS) in the summer of 1993 in the Bosanska Posavina region of northern Bosnia and Herzegovina. The operation, also known as the Battle for the "Power Corridor", aimed to secure a strategically important route that ensured an uninterrupted supply of electricity to Bosnian Krajina. In addition to capturing key settlements, the offensive expanded the Bosnian Serb corridor showing that the VRS could advance in some of the most fortified areas through concentrated elite units, superior firepower, and coordinated planning.

== Prelude ==
Since the stable and adequate electricity supply of Bosnian Krajina was threatened due to the state of war, the VRS decided to expand the corridor near Brčko to include and repair the electric line that passed through the villages of Brod, Donja Brka, Kolonija, Lipovac, Đukići and Bajići.

In the operation, the VRS engaged units of the 1st Krajina Corps and the East Bosnian Corps, divided into two tactical groups. The first tactical group (TG-1) relied on the Garda Panteri, the special detachment "Peša" of the 1st Posavina Brigade, the 4th Battalion of the 43rd Prijedor Mtbr, as well as parts of the elite 1st Battalion of the Military Police; TG-1 advanced in the direction of s. Brod and s. Mustache. The second tactical group (TG-2) was led by the 16th Krajina Motorized Brigade and the 5th Kozar brigade in the direction of s. Bajići, s. Lipovac and s. Djukići. An armored battalion of the First Armored Brigade also participated in the operation; artillery support was provided by the 1st and 3rd mixed artillery regiments.

The ARBiH relied on the following brigades during the operation: 21st Srebrenik Brigade, 108th Motorized Brigade and 108th HVO Brigade; all together 12,000 soldiers. The advantage of the defense was reflected in the terrain impassable by tanks (intertwined with canals) and flat area (easy control of enemy infantry attacks). This meant that the armor and maneuverability of the elite infantry units, one of the main strengths of the VRS —was of little or no use from the start. In addition, the VRS could not use the great superiority in artillery due to the density of the enemy's defense (the length of the front was about 15 kilometers, which means that the ARBiH had almost one man per meter in defense); high density allowed defense in depth, that is, more lines. On the other hand, the basic handicap of the ARBiH was the lack of heavy weapons (about 6,000 soldiers only possessed infantry weapons), which condemned the ARBiH to leave the initiative to the attacker in the plains.

== Offensive ==
The operation lasted seven days, from 20 to 27 July, and ended successfully. During the first few days of the operation, the advance of VRS forces was weak. The turning point occurred on 24 July, when special units of the VRS broke through the ARBiH positions and occupied the village of Brod and parts of Lipovac. By 27 July and the end of the operation, the VRS had conquered the following places: Dizdaruša, Brod, Kolonija, parts Lipovac, Omerbegovača and some parts of Brka, Although, they did lose those gained parts near Brka and Lipovac, Brčko remained a part of The VRS till the end of the War. With Brčko secured, the VRS was now able to switch focus to the ongoing Operation Lukavac '93 and the encirclement of the town of Goražde.

== Sources ==
- Central Intelligence Agency, Office of Russian and European Analysis (2002). Balkan battlegrounds: a military history of the Yugoslav conflict, 1990–1995, Volume 2. Washington, D.C.: Central Intelligence Agency. ISBN 978-0-16-066472-4.
