= Brčko offensive =

1993 attack during the Bosnian War

Brčko offensive (1993)
- Part of the Bosnian War
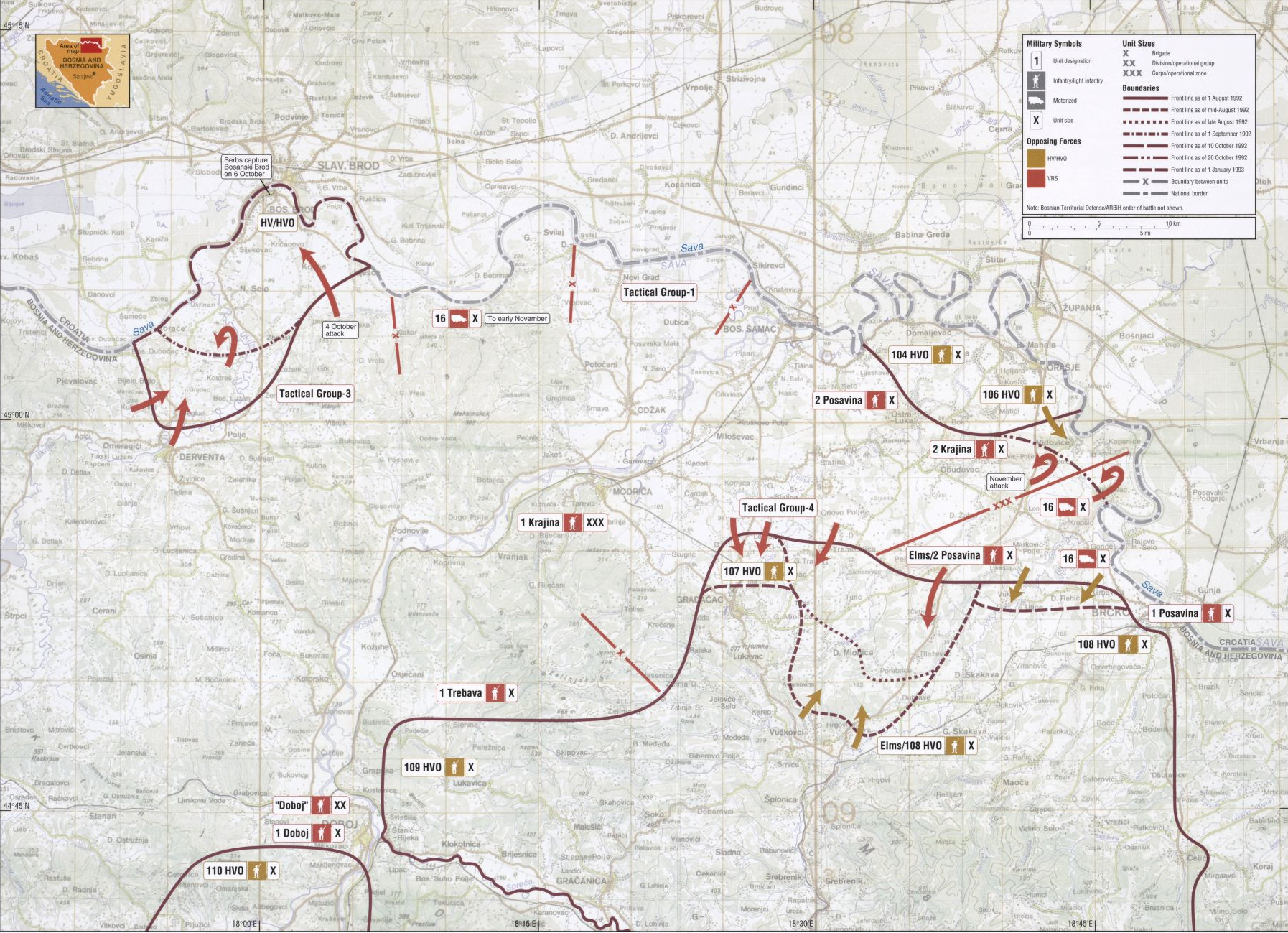
- A map of the offensive
Date	1 January — 12 January 1993
Location	Brčko, Bosnia and Herzegovina 44°52′N 18°49′E
Result	Army of Republika Srpska victory: VRS widens the Posavina corridor near Brčko and retains gains against the ARBiH and the HVO

Belligerents
Republika Srpska	Bosnia and Herzegovina; Herzeg-Bosnia

Commanders and leaders
(Republika Srpska) Momir Talić	Unknown

Units involved
Army of Republika Srpska (VRS): 1st Krajina Corps; East Bosnia Corps	Croatian Defence Council (HVO); Army of the Republic of Bosnia and Herzegovina (ARBiH)

Casualties and losses
Unknown	Unknown

The Brčko Offensive, also known as Operation Corridor '93, was a offensive undertaken by the Army of Republika Srpska (VRS) in early January 1993 with the objective of widening and securing the Posavina Corridor near Brčko. The corridor, which connected western and eastern parts of Republika Srpska, had come under repeated pressure from combined Croatian Defence Council (HVO) and Army of the Republic of Bosnia and Herzegovina (ARBiH) attacks in late 1992.

The VRS launched counterattacks to prevent the corridor from being severed, a strategic concern repeatedly noted in international military assessments and United Nations reporting.

== Background ==
The Posavina Corridor was established by the VRS during Operation Corridor 92 in mid-1992 to restore an overland link between Banja Luka and the eastern parts of Republika Srpska. UN and Western military analyses consistently described the corridor as the "strategic lifeline" of the Bosnian Serb forces.

By late 1992, the narrowest sector of the corridor—near Brčko—became the focus of intense fighting. ARBiH and HVO forces launched coordinated local offensives from Orašje and villages south of Brčko, temporarily disrupting VRS communications and briefly cutting the route northwest of the town on several occasions.

These attacks prompted the VRS high command under General Momir Talić of the 1st Krajina Corps to reinforce Brčko and prepare a counteroffensive.

== Offensive ==
According to the CIA publication Balkan Battlegrounds, the VRS began operations around 1 January 1993, deploying units from both the 1st Krajina Corps and the East Bosnian Corps. The aim was to regain tactically important ground lost in late 1992 and expand the defensive belt around Brčko.

VRS units advanced toward several settlements controlling approaches to the corridor. CIA analysis describes VRS "incremental but successful" gains in early January, enabling a widening of the narrowest portion of the corridor and stabilizing the front line.

HVO and ARBiH forces launched a renewed counterattack on 2 January, again temporarily cutting the corridor northwest of Brčko. For approximately ten days, intense fighting took place along the contested line, involving heavy artillery, entrenched infantry combat, and night counterattacks—patterns documented extensively in UNPROFOR situation reports for early 1993.

By mid-January, the VRS had restored the corridor and regained previously contested positions. The front subsequently solidified, though Brčko remained one of the most heavily shelled and dangerous sectors in Bosnia and Herzegovina throughout 1993.

== Aftermath ==
With the corridor restored and widened, the VRS retained uninterrupted logistical and military links across northern Bosnia. Western intelligence assessments noted that control of Brčko remained a key priority for the VRS throughout 1993–1995, resulting in recurring operations including further corridor-stabilization engagements in mid-1993.

The area remained contested until the end of the war, ultimately becoming a subject of post-war arbitration and resulting in the formation of the internationally supervised Brčko District in 1999.

== Sources ==
- Central Intelligence Agency, Office of Russian and European Analysis (2002). Balkan Battlegrounds: A Military History of the Yugoslav Conflict, 1990–1995, Volume 1. Washington, D.C.: Central Intelligence Agency. ISBN 978-0-16-066472-4.
- Central Intelligence Agency, Office of Russian and European Analysis (2002). Balkan Battlegrounds: a Military History of the Yugoslav conflict, 1990–1995. Vol. 2. Washington, D.C.: Central Intelligence Agency. ISBN 978-0-16-066472-4.
- Burg, Steven L.; Shoup, Paul S. (1999). The War in Bosnia-Herzegovina: Ethnic Conflict and International Intervention. M.E. Sharpe. ISBN 9781563243080.
- Silber, Laura; Little, Allan (1996). The Death of Yugoslavia. Penguin Books. ISBN 9780140261684.
