= Novica Simić =

Bosnian Serb military general

- Born: 18 November 1948; Nova Kasaba, Milići, PR Bosnia and Herzegovina, FPR Yugoslavia
- Died: 2 March 2012 (aged 63); Belgrade, Serbia
- Burial place: Saint Pantelija Cemetery, Banja Luka
- Military career
- Allegiance: (Socialist Federal Republic of Yugoslavia) SFR Yugoslavia; Republika Srpska
- Branch: Yugoslav People's Army (until 1992); Army of Republika Srpska (1992–2003)
- Rank: Lieutenant general
- Unit: East Bosnia Corps
- Conflicts: Bosnian War; Operation Corridor; Operation Sadejstvo
- Awards: Order of the Star of Karađorđe

Novica Simić (Serbian Cyrillic: Новица Симић; 18 November 1948 – 2 March 2012) was a Bosnian Serb military general during the Bosnian War.

In 2022 "March of General Novica Simić" was composed by Dušan Pokrajčić, for his merit in Operation Corridor, which connected two parts of Serbian Republic.

== Awards/Recognitions ==
- Nemanjić award
- Order of the Star of Karađorđe, 1st level
- Bravery award of the Yugoslav People's Army
- Ribbon of Modriča, posthumously awarded 2012

== Published books ==
- Koridor 92, Veterans Association of Republika Srpska, Banja Luka (2011)

== Personal ==
His brother Goran Simić was a poet who supported the Bosnian government during the war. His son is writer Danijel Simić.

Military offices
Preceded by Momir Talić	Chief of the General Staff of the Army of Republika Srpska; 1999–2002	Succeeded by Cvjetko Savić
