= Battle of Azići =

1993 event of the Siege of Sarajevo

- Part of Siege of Sarajevo
| Date | 15–20 February 1993 |
| Location | Azići, Sarajevo, Bosnia and Herzegovina |
| Result | Army of Republika Srpska victory |
| Territorial changes | VRS captures Azići |

Belligerents
| Republika Srpska | Republic of Bosnia and Herzegovina |

Commanders and leaders
| (Republika Srpska) Momir Talić | (Bosnia and Herzegovina) Unknown |

Units involved
| Army of Republika Srpska: 1st Sarajevo Mechanized Brigade; 1st Ilidžan Brigade | Unknown |

Strength
| 1,000–1,500 | Unknown |

Casualties and losses
| Unknown | 300 killed |

The Battle of Azići was one of the battles in the Siege of Sarajevo in 1993. The VRS made its first step in the operation in the suburbs in early December 1992, breaking through the suburb of Otes, some 15 kilometers west of central Sarajevo. In the middle of February, the Sarajevo-Romanijan Corps started the second part of the campaign, attacked Azići, the troops of the 1st Ilidžan Infantry Brigade attacked with support tanks and armored personnel carriers of the 1st Sarajevo Mechanized Brigade.

== Flow of the Battle ==
The attack was led by several special assault units. The total assault force, probably numbering 1,000 to 1,500 soldiers, artillery and mortars from units throughout the area, supported the attack with significant fire support, including fire from 155mm howitzers and multiple rocket launchers from the 4th Mixed Artillery Regiment, against the planned attack 3rd Motorized Brigade/1. corps defended the Azići-Stup sector. As the Serbian intentions became clear, the 1st Corps reinforced the brigade with mobile elements of other formations that filled the defense lines of the city. The VRS attacked on February 15, quickly storming ARBiH positions with direct tank fire and artillery and mortar shells targeting government defenders. The Serbs slowly advanced through the city over the next five days, pushing the Muslim units back building by building. By February 20, Serbian troops occupied Azići. The defeat resulted in the counting of four Bosnian army officers and the renaming of the 3rd Motorized Brigade.
