= Stanislav Galić =

Bosnian-Serb war criminal

Stanislav Galić (Serbian Cyrillic: Станислав Галић; born 12 March 1943) is a Bosnian Serb soldier and war criminal and former commander of the Sarajevo-Romanija Corps of the Army of Republika Srpska (VRS) during the War in Bosnia and Herzegovina. He was convicted of terror as a crime against humanity, and murder as violations of the laws and customs of war, for his part in the Siege of Sarajevo.

== Background ==
Galić was born in the hamlet of Goleš, in the municipality of Banja Luka, Bosnia and Herzegovina. Prior to the beginning of the war he was an officer in the Yugoslav People's Army. On 7 September 1992, he became the commander of the Sarajevo-Romanija Corps (Sarajevsko-romanijski korpus), the unit of the VRS which besieged Sarajevo, the capital of Bosnia and Herzegovina. Galić remained commander of the SRK until 10 August 1994 when he was replaced by Dragomir Milošević.

== War crimes ==
In 1998, the International Criminal Tribunal for the Former Yugoslavia indicted Galić on the basis of individual responsibility on charges of murder, inhumane acts other than murder, crimes against humanity, unlawfully inflicting terror upon civilians, attacks on civilians and violations of the laws and customs of war. The indictment was sealed until Galić was arrested by the British SAS on 20 December 1999. On 5 December 2003, his trial ended in a conviction and a 20-year sentence for the shelling and sniping of Sarajevo. Galić appealed the judgement. On 30 November 2006, his appeal was rejected and the appeals chamber extended his sentence from 20 years to life imprisonment. He was taken to Germany to serve his sentence.
