= 2nd Corps (Army of the Republic of Bosnia and Herzegovina) =

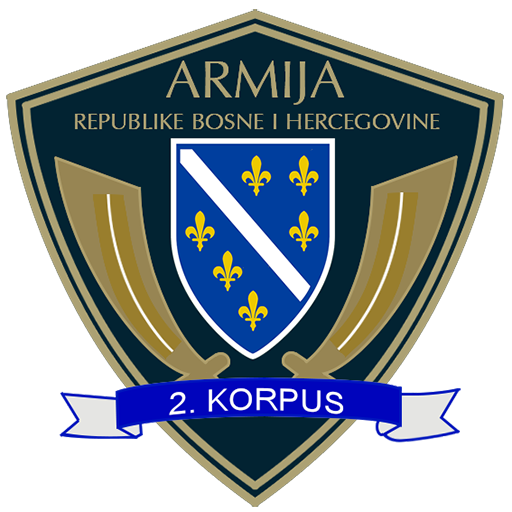
- 2nd Corps Patch
- Active: 29 September 1992 – 1995
- Country: Bosnia and Herzegovina
- Allegiance: Army of the Republic of Bosnia and Herzegovina
- Branch: Regular Army
- Type: Motorized, Mountain and Infantry
- Role: Defence of Tuzla
- Size: 49.972 (1992), 67.035 (1995)
- Garrison/HQ: Tuzla
- Colors: Green
- Engagements: Battle of Budučin Potok; Operation Drina 93'; Operation Corridor '93; Operation Sadejstvo; Battle of Vareš; Battle of Karuše; Operation Brana '94; Operation Porljeće '94; Assault on Donja Brka (1994); Battle of Vozuća; Assault on Majevica (1995)

Commanders
- Notable commanders: Željko Knez; Hazim Šadić; Sead Delić

The 2nd Corps was one of five, later seven corps in the Army of the Republic of Bosnia and Herzegovina established in early 1992.

== History ==
The 2nd Corps was formed on September 29, 1992, with its headquarters in Tuzla. It was the largest corps of the ARBiH and had the largest operational zone, ranging from Banovići to Gradačac to Brčko to Kladanj. Additionally, it also held jurisdiction over the semi-independent Operational Group 8, later the 28th division, in the UN-protected enclaves of Srebrenica and Žepa.

== Operational zones ==
The 2nd Corps was responsible for the following districts: Tuzla (where were the headquarters of the corps), Doboj, Bijeljina, Srebrenica, Žepa, Zvornik.

== Commanders ==
- 1st Commander: Major general Željko Knez
- 2nd Commander: Brigadier Hazim Šadić
- 3rd Commander: Brigadier Sead Delić

== Units ==
The 2nd Corps had 8 operational groups:

- 1st Operational Group (Gradačac)
  - 21st Brigade
  - 107th Motorized Brigade "Zmaj od Bosne" (Gradačac)
  - 108th Motorized Brigade "Legendarna" (Brčko)/215th Motorized Knights Brigade Brčko
  - 108th HVO Brigade
  - 208th Brigade
- 2nd Operational Group (Gračanica)
  - 109th Mountain Brigade (Doboj)
  - 111th Brigade (Gračanica)
  - 117th Brigade "Džemisetski Golubovi" (Lukavac)
- 3rd Operational Group (Kladanj)
  - Commander: Erdin Hrustić
    - 1st Olovo Brigade
    - 121st Mountain Brigade (Kladanj)
    - 302nd Brigade
- 4th Operational Group (Kalesija)
  - 205th Brigade (Kalesija)
  - 206th Mountain Brigade (Zvornik)
  - 207th Mountain Brigade (Tešanj)
- 5th Operational Group (Tuzla)
  - 1st Tuzla Brigade
  - 2nd Tuzla Brigade
  - 3rd Tuzla Brigade
- 6th Operational Group (Živinice)
  - Commander: Hasan Muratović
    - 116th Mountain Brigade
    - 118th Brigade
    - 119th Mountain Brigade (Banovići)
      - Commander: Nihad Šehović
    - 210th Brigade
- 7th/South Operational Group (Tesanj)(Maglaj)
  - 110th HVO Brigade (Žepče)
  - 111th HVO Brigade (Usora)
  - 201st Brigade (Maglaj)
    - Commander: Colonel Esad Hindić
  - 202nd Mountain Brigade (Teslić)
  - 203rd Motorized Brigade (Doboj)
  - 204th Mountain Brigade (Teslić) (Nov. 1994, Operational Group to 3rd Corps)
  - 207th Brigade
- 8th Operational Group (Srebrenica)
  - Commander: Naser Orić
  - Deputy Commander: Fahrudin Alić
    - 180th Brigade
    - 181st Brigade
    - 183rd Brigade
    - 184th Brigade
    - 283rd Brigade
      - Commander: Major Huso Halilović
- 285th Light Mountain Brigade (Žepa)
  - Commander: Colonel Avdo Palić

== Arms ==
- Zastava M70 Yugoslavia active since 1992–1995, 1995–present
- M-16 United States active since 1994–1996, 1996–present
- AK-47 Soviet Union active since 1991–1995, 1996–present
- AR-15 United States active since 1994–present (used by Tuzla special forces today)

== Military operations and engagements ==
- Battle of Budučin Potok
- Operation "Proljeće" 1994
- Battle for Ozren and Vozuća
- Operation "Farz 95"

== Trivia ==
- The 204th Teslić Mountain Brigade (Bashkir: 204. teslićka brigada) gained some attention in the Yugoslav war music scene after rock songs performed by soldiers of the brigade, led by Hasim Huskić and filmed in 1995, were uploaded online.
