= Brod, Brčko =

Brod Брод
- Village
- Location within Bosnia and Herzegovina
- Coordinates: 44°51′33″N 18°46′01″E
- Country: Bosnia and Herzegovina
- Entity: Brčko District

Area
  - Total: 2.13 sq mi (5.52 km^{2})

Population (2013)
  - Total: 1,286
  - Density: 603/sq mi (233/km^{2})
- Time zone: UTC+1 (CET)
  - Summer (DST): UTC+2 (CEST)

Brod (Serbian Cyrillic: Брод) is a village in the municipality of Brčko, Bosnia and Herzegovina.

== Demographics ==
According to the 2013 census, its population was 1,286.

Ethnicity in 2013
Ethnicity	Number	Percentage
Bosniaks	1,223	95.1%
Serbs	30	2.3%
Croats	13	1.0%
other/undeclared	20	1.6%
Total	1,286	100%
