= Brčko corridor =

Land strip connecting parts of Republika Srpska

Brčko corridor (1995-2000) and Brčko District (since 2000).

The Brčko corridor (also known as the Serbian corridor, Serbian: Српски коридор / Srpski koridor and the Posavina Corridor) was a name for a narrow strip of land along the southern bank of the Sava river that connected eastern and western part of the Republika Srpska from 1992 to 2000. It was created in 1992, after military Operation Corridor 92 and was an important military and civil supply line for western parts of the Republika Srpska and Republic of Serbian Krajina during the Bosnian and Croatian war. After the Dayton Agreement was signed in 1995, the corridor remained within Republika Srpska, but subsequent international arbitration assigned this territory to a newly formed Brčko District (created in 2000), which became a territorial condominium shared between the Republika Srpska and the Federation of Bosnia and Herzegovina.

The intersection of the road through this corridor and the IFOR "Arizona" road was the beginning of the Arizona Market.

== Sources ==
- Meier, Viktor (1999). Yugoslavia: a history of its demise. Routledge. ISBN 9780415185967.
- Gosar, Anton; Rožac-Darovec, Vida; Staut, Miha (2005). Globalized Europe. Univerza na Primorskem, Znanstveno-raziskovalno središče, Založba Annales. ISBN 9789616033688.
- Barton, Brooke; Herrero, Gustavo; Quelch, John A.; Rangan, V. Kashturi, eds. (2007). Business Solutions for the Global Poor: Creating Social and Economic Value. Wiley. ISBN 9780787988548.
