= Operation Corridor 92 =

1992 military offensive in Bosnia and Herzegovina

Coordinates: 45.144707°N 17.999861°E

- Part of the Bosnian War
- The objectives of Operation Corridor 92 on the map of Bosnia and Herzegovina
Date	24 June – 6 October 1992
Location	Bosanska Posavina, Northern Bosnia and Herzegovina
Result	Army of Republika Srpska victory: Establishment of the Brčko Corridor
Territorial changes	VRS gained the territories of Derventa, Odžak, Modriča, Brod and surroundings

Belligerents
Republika Srpska; Republic of Serbian Krajina	Croatia; Croatian Community of Bosnian Posavina

Commanders and leaders
Republika Srpska; Momir Talić; Novica Simić; Serbian Krajina; Milan Martić; Serb Volunteer Guard; Željko Ražnatović	Croatia; Petar Stipetić; Vinko Štefanek

Units involved
Army of Republika Srpska; 1st Krajina Corps; 2nd Krajina Brigade; 16th Krajina Brigade; Wolves of Vučjak; 1st Prnjavor Brigade; East Bosnia Corps; Garda Panteri; Air Force of Republika Srpska; Special Units of the Serbian Krajina Militia; Serb Volunteer Guard	Croatian Army; 3rd Guards Brigade; 108th Slavonski Brod Brigade; 109th Vinkovci Brigade; 111th Rijeka Brigade; Croatian Defence Council; 101st Bosanski Brod Brigade; 102nd Odžak Brigade; 103rd Derventa Brigade; 104th Domaljevac-Šamac Brigade; 105th Modriča Brigade; 106th Orašje Brigade; 107th Gradačac Brigade; 108th Ravne-Brčko Brigade; Croatian Defence Forces

Strength
40,800 soldiers (June); 54,660 soldiers (October)	20,000 soldiers (June); 5,000 soldiers (October)

Casualties and losses
413 killed 1,509 wounded	1,261 killed 6,250 wounded
- 116 civilians killed in Slavonski Brod, Croatia

Operation Corridor 92 (Serbo-Croatian: Операција Коридор 92, Operacija Koridor 92) was the largest operation conducted during the Bosnian War by the Army of Republika Srpska (VRS) against the forces of the Croatian Defence Council (HVO) and the Croatian Army (HV) in the Bosanska Posavina region of northern Bosnia and Herzegovina between 24 June and 6 October 1992. The objective of the offensive was to re-establish a road link between the city of Banja Luka in the west of the country and the eastern parts of the territory controlled by the Bosnian Serbs. The offensive was prompted by the capture of Derventa by the HV and the HVO – a move that blocked the single overland road between the VRS-controlled territories.

The VRS successfully captured Derventa and pushed the HVO and the HV north, capturing several towns in the process. In the second phase of the offensive, the VRS reached the Sava River, the border with Croatia, and destroyed a bridgehead held by the HV and the HVO at Bosanski Brod. The offensive involved more than 60,000 troops and resulted in heavy casualties for all sides, especially the HVO. The Croatian National Defence Council commissioned a report into the loss of Bosanska Posavina and blamed internal conflicts, a double chain of command and ineffective counterintelligence for the defeat. The outcome later caused speculation that it was the result of a political arrangement between Serb and Croatian leaders to secure a land trade, though a Central Intelligence Agency analysis rejected such allegations.

== Background ==
As the Yugoslav People's Army (Jugoslovenska narodna armija – JNA) withdrew from Croatia following the acceptance and start of implementation of the Vance plan, its 55,000 officers and soldiers born in Bosnia and Herzegovina were transferred to a new Bosnian Serb army, which was later renamed the Army of Republika Srpska (Vojska Republike Srpske – VRS). This reorganisation followed the declaration of the Serbian Republic of Bosnia and Herzegovina on 9 January 1992, ahead of the 29 February – 1 March 1992 referendum on the independence of Bosnia and Herzegovina. This declaration would later be cited by the Bosnian Serbs as a pretext for the Bosnian War. Bosnian Serbs began fortifying the capital, Sarajevo, and other areas on 1 March. On the following day, the first fatalities of the war were recorded in Sarajevo and Doboj. In the final days of March, Bosnian Serb forces bombarded Bosanski Brod with artillery, drawing a border crossing by the HV 108th Brigade in response. On 4 April, JNA artillery began shelling Sarajevo.

The JNA and the VRS in Bosnia and Herzegovina faced the Army of the Republic of Bosnia and Herzegovina (Armija Republike Bosne i Hercegovine – ARBiH) and the Croatian Defence Council (Hrvatsko vijeće obrane – HVO), reporting to the Bosniak-dominated central government and the Bosnian Croat leadership respectively, as well as the HV, which occasionally supported HVO operations. A UN arms embargo introduced in September 1991, had hampered the preparation of the various forces, but in late April, the VRS was able to deploy 200,000 troops, along with hundreds of tanks, armoured personnel carriers (APCs) and artillery pieces, while the HVO and the Croatian Defence Forces (Hrvatske obrambene snage – HOS) could field approximately 25,000 soldiers and a handful of heavy weapons. The ARBiH was largely unprepared, however, lacking heavy weapons and possessing small arms for less than half of its force of approximately 100,000 troops. By mid-May 1992, when those JNA units which had not been transferred to the VRS withdrew from Bosnia and Herzegovina to the newly declared Federal Republic of Yugoslavia, the VRS controlled approximately 60 percent of Bosnia and Herzegovina.

== Bosanska Posavina ==
=== Area and population ===
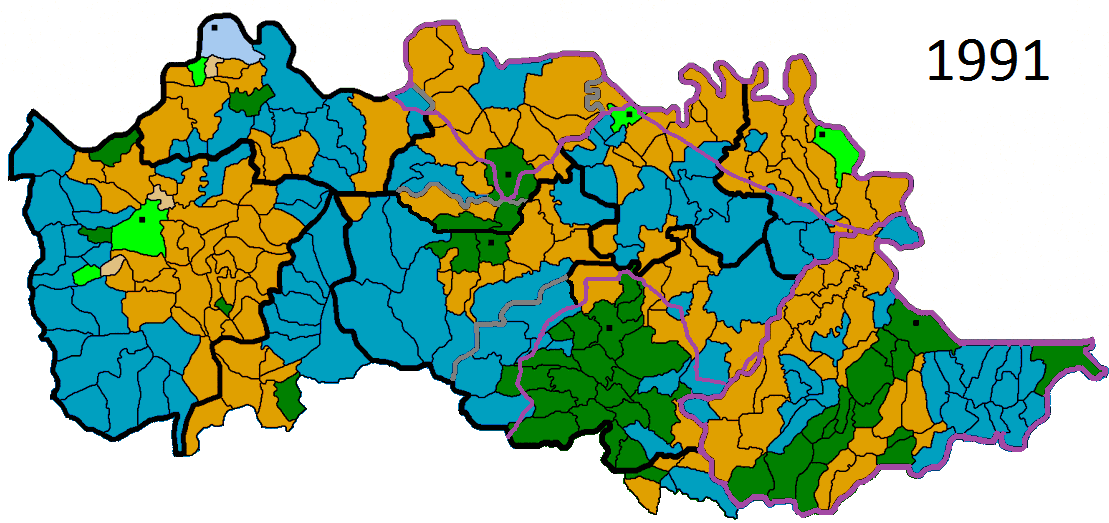
Ethnic composition of Bosanska Posavina in 1991 Croats Serbs Bosniaks

The geographic area in the basin of the Sava River consisted in part or entirely of 15 municipalities: Bosanska Dubica, Bosanska Gradiška, Srbac, Bosanski Brod, Derventa, Odžak, Modriča, Gradačac, Bosanski Šamac, Orašje, Brčko, Srebrenik, Bijeljina, Lopare, and Ugljevik. Since the 1990s, the use of the term Bosanska Posavina relates almost exclusively for predominantly Croat inhabited areas within the municipalities of Bosanski Brod, Derventa, Odžak, Modriča, Gradačac, Bosanski Šamac, Orašje and Brčko. These municipalities had an area of 2,289.15 square kilometres (883.85 mi^{2}) and were in 1991 inhabited by 319,593 people, of which 133,467 (41.76%) were Croats, 70,907 (22.19%) were Bosniaks, and 88,484 (27.69%) were Serbs. The region was connected with Croatia by four bridges on the Sava River.

=== Political organization ===
Following the 1990 parliamentary election, the Croatian Democratic Union (HDZ) had a majority in six municipalities of Bosanska Posavina. However, the political situation in the region, especially by the end of 1991, was marked with obstructions by the Serb Democratic Party (SDS) that established parallel authorities. Throughout 1991, the SDS established six autonomous regions (SAOs) in Serb-inhabited municipalities of Bosnia and Herzegovina. The SAO Northern Bosnia, proclaimed in Doboj in November, covered 17 municipalities, including Derventa, Bosanski Brod, Odžak, Bosanski Šamac, Modriča, Gradačac and Orašje. These SAOs were joined into Republika Srpska on 9 January 1992.

On 12 November 1991, the Croatian Community of Bosnian Posavina was established in Bosanski Brod. It covered eight municipalities: Bosanski Brod, Odžak, Bosanski Šamac, Orašje, Derventa, Modriča, Gradačac and Brčko.

== Prelude ==
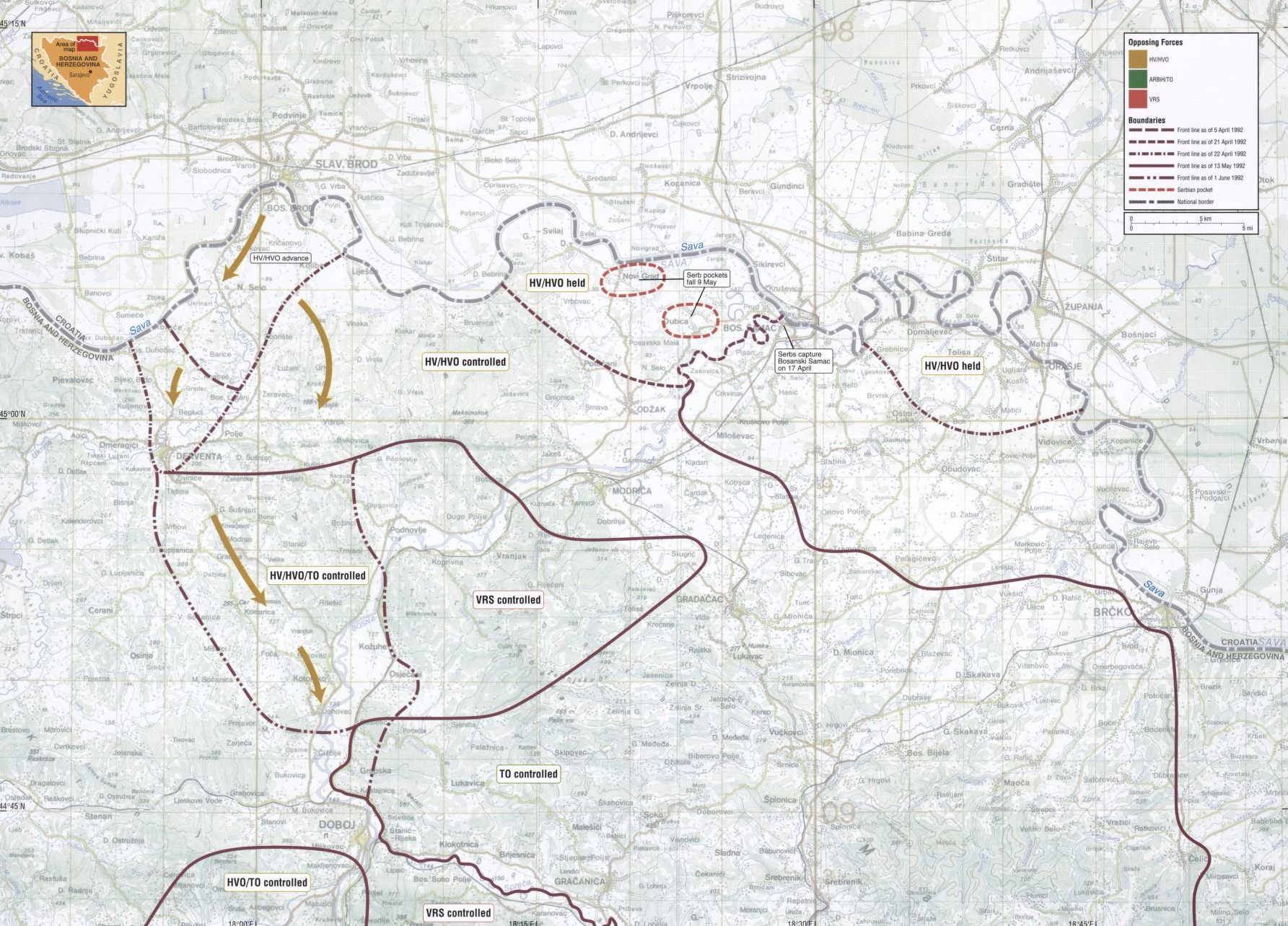
Map of military deployments in the Bosanska Posavina, April–June 1992

Following its successful defence of Bosanski Brod in March, the HVO, reinforced by HV troops, pushed the JNA and the VRS south from the town and captured the towns of Modriča and Derventa by the end of May. The capture of Derventa also severed the last road available to the Bosnian Serbs spanning VRS-controlled western Bosnia around Banja Luka and the VRS-held territory in the east of the country, adjacent to Serbia. That prevented the supply of Banja Luka as well as the bulk of the territory gained by the Republic of Serbian Krajina (RSK) and Croatian Serbs in Croatia since the initial phase of the Croatian War of Independence.

The loss of the road link caused substantial supply problems in Banja Luka and the surrounding area, and resulted in a VRS counterattack against the HVO and HV forces in the area. At the same time, the VRS and the JNA captured Doboj and Bosanski Šamac to the east and south of the HVO/HV advance. In June, the VRS 1st Krajina Corps initiated preliminary operations against the HVO/HV-held area around Derventa, attempting to improve VRS positions needed to launch a major attack there. By 20 June, the VRS captured the villages of Kotorsko and Johovac north of Doboj and achieved the main objective of the preliminary advance.

The deaths of twelve newborn babies in Banja Luka hospital due to a shortage of incubator bottled oxygen were cited as an immediate cause for the action.

== Offensive ==
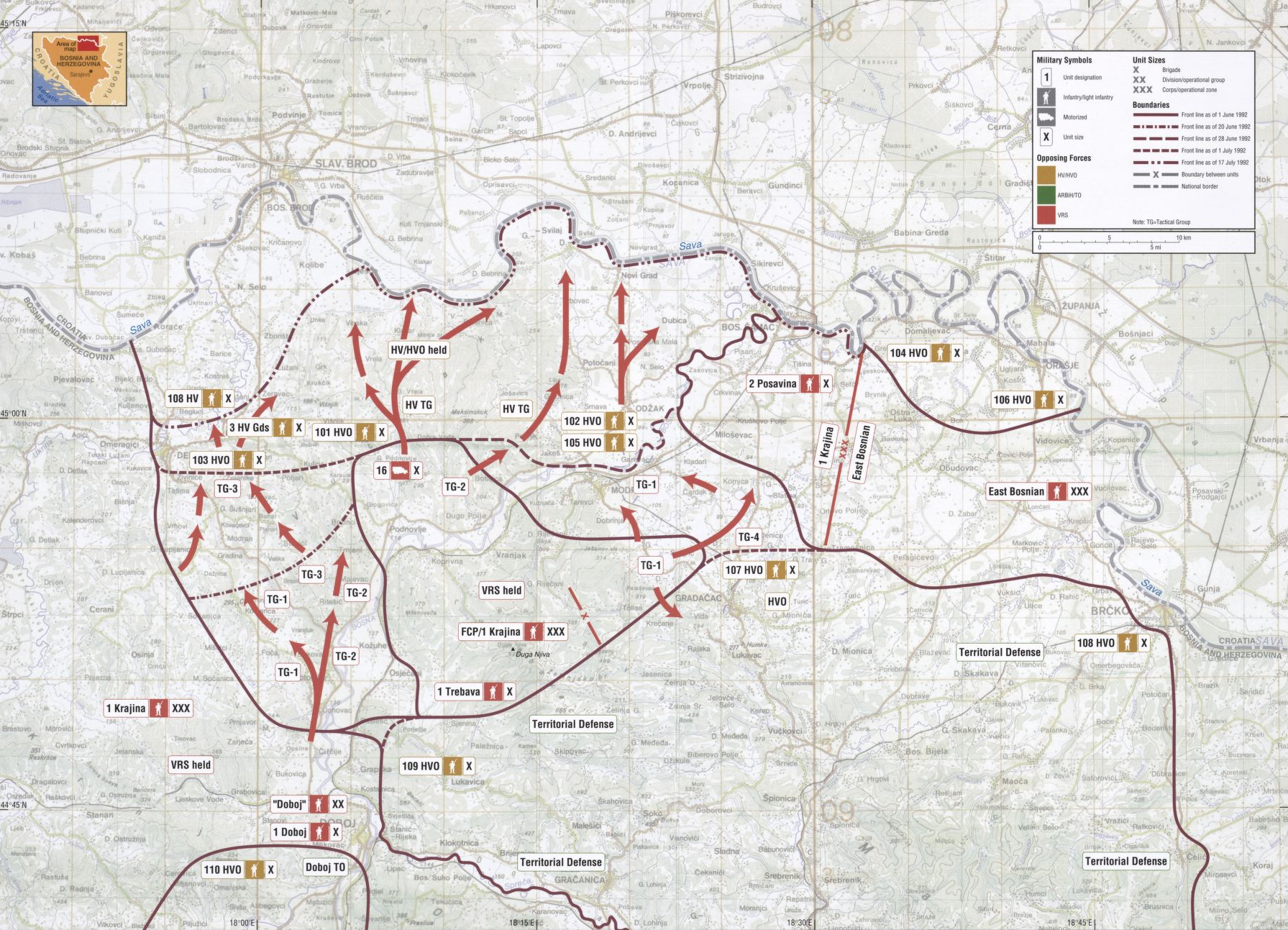
Map of Operation Corridor 92

=== Order of Battle ===
The VRS deployed over 40,000 troops at the beginning of Operation Corridor 92, and the force was increased to 54,660 by the end of the initial phase of the offensive. The VRS tasked the 1st Krajina Corps with the main effort of the offensive, organized into four Tactical Groups, the 16th Krajina Motorized Brigade, and Operational Group Doboj. The corps and the operation were under command of General Momir Talić. The RSK also contributed troops to the offensive. A volunteer force of 780 troops, composed of special units of the Ministry of Interior, arrived in June and these forces were commanded directly by the RSK Interior Minister, Milan Martić.

The HVO and the HV had around 20,000 troops in the region at the outset of the VRS offensive, but the troop levels declined to about 5,000 by month October. Initially, these units were organized into the Operational Group Sava and Operational Group Eastern Posavina. From mid-May they were organised as Operational Group Eastern Posavina, commanded by Colonel Vinko Štefanek, and subordinated to the Slavonian Field Command in Đakovo commanded by HV Major General Petar Stipetić. HVO units included the 101st Brod Brigade, 102nd Odžak Brigade, 103rd Derventa Brigade, 104th Domaljevac-Šamac Brigade, 106th Orašje Brigade, 107th Gradačac Brigade, 108th Ravne-Brčko and 109th ARBiH Brigade. The troops also included elements of a large number of HV units: the bulk of the 108th Infantry Brigade based in Slavonski Brod, and parts of the 139th Brigade and 3rd Guards Brigade. HV units from Slavonia and central Croatia were also occasionally engaged: fragments of the 109th, 111th, 123rd and 127th Brigades based in Vinkovci, Rijeka, Požega and Virovitica, as well as several Osijek-based units. Around 200 members of the Croatian Defence Forces (HOS) were engaged on the front, operating independently or under the command of the 108th HV Brigade. Croat forces mostly acquired weapons from the HV logistics base in Slavonski Brod. On 15 May 1992, the United Nations issued resolution 752, demanding the withdrawal of HV units from Bosnia and Herzegovina. As the presence of HV units was constantly objected by foreign observers, on 7 July 1992 the Croatian Defence Minister Gojko Šušak issued an order that only volunteers could be deployed to Bosnia and Herzegovina.

The VRS leadership estimated the total strength of the opposing forces at around 25,500 troops. In their estimate they included the 110th and 111th Brigades of the HVO from Usora and Žepče, as well as three brigades of the ARBiH from Gradačac, Maglaj and Tešanj. Although these units were not involved in the fighting in Posavina, they tied a part of the VRS forces on their own positions. Besides manpower, the VRS also held an advantage in armaments. While the Croat forces had 47 combat vehicles, 35 of which were tanks (9 T-34s, 22 T-55s and 4 M-84s), the VRS had 163 combat vehicles, including three PT-76s, 18 T-34s, 71 T-55s and 24 M-84s. The VRS held an advantage in artillery pieces as well.

=== Timeline ===
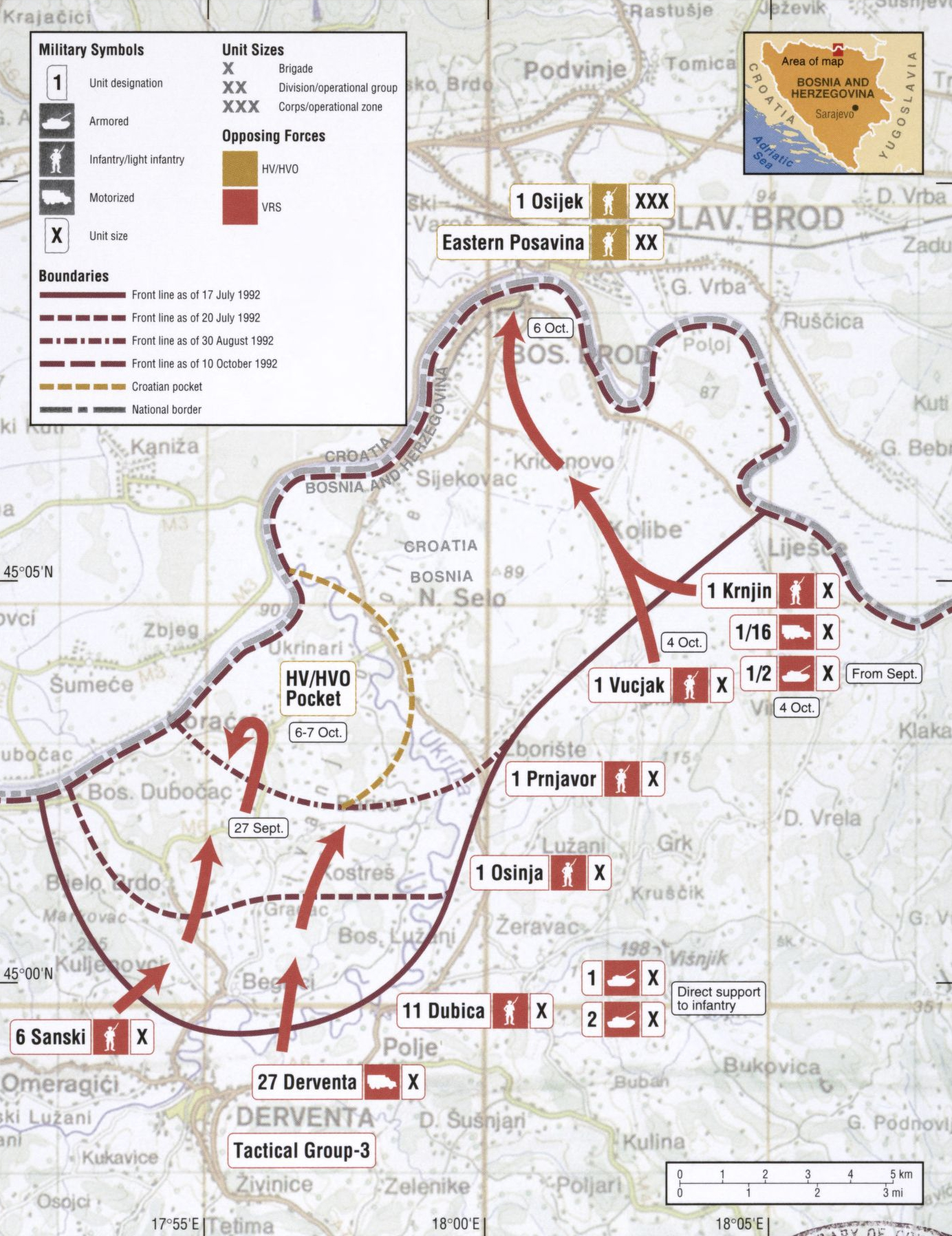
Map of the VRS capture of Bosanski Brod in October 1992

On 24 June, the 1st Krajina Corps of the VRS began the offensive codenamed Operation Corridor 92. Its first objective was to break through the HVO and HV-held positions between Modriča and Gradačac, and link up with the East Bosnian Corps. The secondary effort consisted of attacks towards Derventa and Bosanski Brod. The Air Force of Republika Srpska provided air support to VRS units fighting against HVO and HV forces during the operation. The first objective was achieved after two days of heavy combat on 26 June. Afterwards, the VRS advanced towards Modriča and captured the town on 28 June. The secondary advances, facing considerably stiffer resistance by the HVO and the HV, gained little ground.

The second phase of the offensive was launched on 4 July. It comprised VRS advances towards Derventa, Bosanski Brod and Odžak, aiming to reach the Sava and thereby the border with Croatia, north of the three towns. Derventa was quickly captured on 4–5 July and the VRS continued to roll back the HVO and the HV troops. On 12 July, the VRS captured Odžak and arrived at the riverside near the town two days later. By that time, VRS troops had advanced 10 to 15 kilometres (6.2 to 9.3 miles), and reached a position within 10 kilometres (6.2 miles) of Bosanski Brod. The HVO and the HV were reduced to a bridgehead around the town.

In August and September, the VRS launched several attacks against the Bosanski Brod bridgehead for little gain. In mid-September, the HVO and the ARBiH deployed near Brčko, further to the east, attacked the same east–west road the VRS aimed to secure through Operation Corridor 92. The counterattack managed to capture a section of the road south of Orašje, at the eastern end of the Brčko corridor. However, the VRS restored its control of the road quickly thereafter.

Another push against Bosanski Brod was launched on 27 September. The advance initially had moderate success, until 4 October when the VRS rebalanced its forces, changing the sector of the bridgehead against which the 1st Krajina Corps was concentrated. The move managed to disrupt the HVO and HV defences and the VRS achieved a breakthrough, capturing Bosanski Brod on 6 October. In response, the HV and the HVO withdrew their troops and equipment in an orderly fashion, and the bridge spanning the Sava between the town and Slavonski Brod was demolished on 7 October.

== Aftermath ==
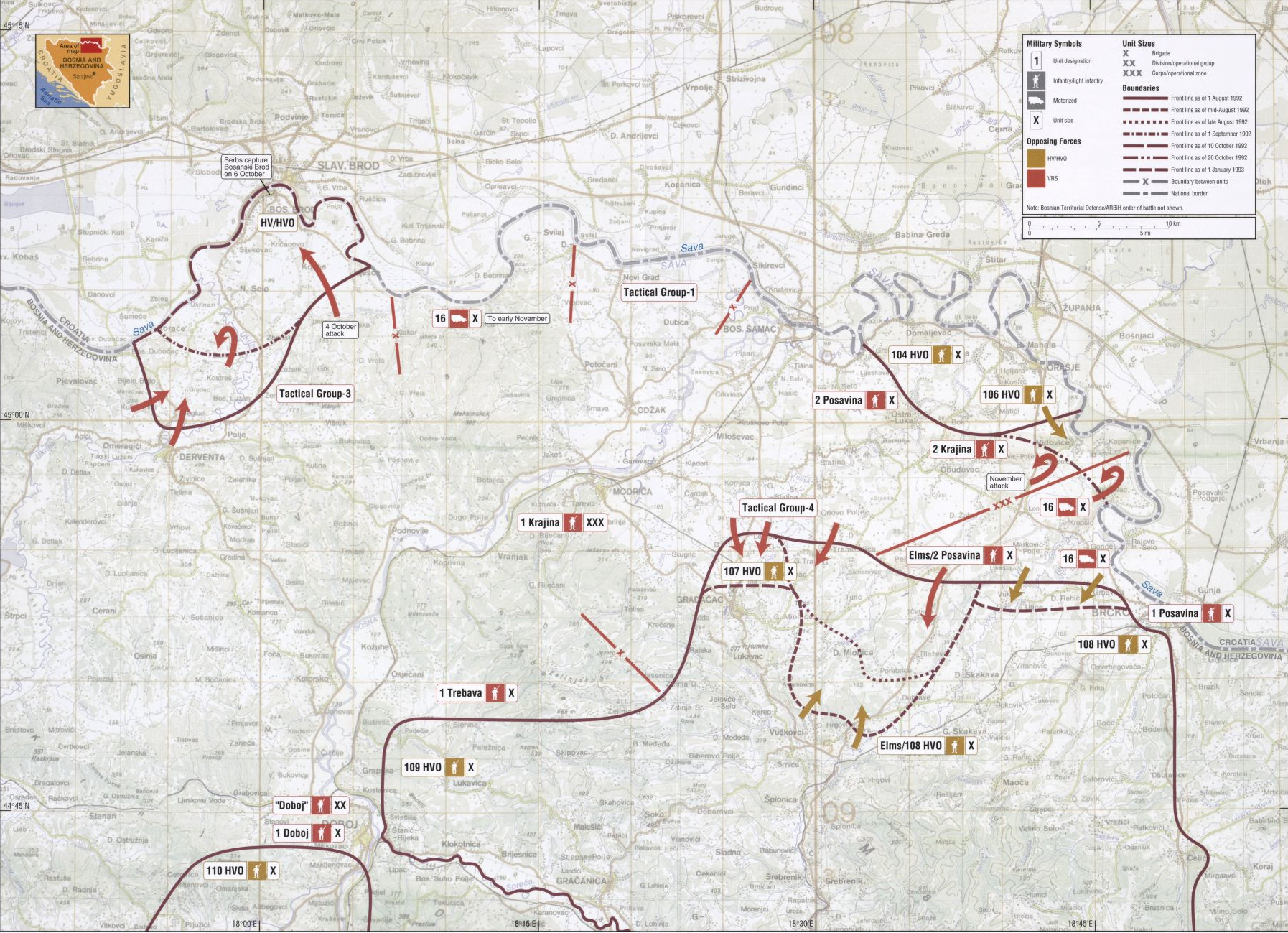
Map of the final stages of Operation Corridor 92 and subsequent operations in the area in late 1992

In mid-October and early November 1992, the HVO briefly cut the Brčko corridor south of Orašje two more times. In turn, the VRS launched a major offensive against the HVO-held bridgehead at Orašje. After some initial success, the VRS offensive failed and the HVO drove the attacking force back to the positions they had held prior to the advance. Aiming to improve the security of the Brčko corridor, units of the VRS 1st Krajina and East Bosnian Corps turned south of Brčko, and advanced 2 to 3 kilometres (1.2 to 1.9 miles) against defences held by the HVO and the ARBiH. That last push widened the Brčko corridor to just 3 kilometres at its narrowest point.

During the offensive, which captured 760 square kilometres (290 square miles) of territory, the VRS and its allies lost 413 troops killed and a further 1,509 wounded. According to Zovak, the HV sustained losses of 343 killed and 1,996 wounded, while the HVO lost 918 killed and 4,254 injured during the fighting that took place in the region between April and October. In the same period, the city of Slavonski Brod came under bombardment from VRS artillery and aircraft. A total of 11,651 artillery shells and fourteen 9K52 Luna-M rockets were fired against the city, and 130 bombs were dropped from the air, resulting in the deaths of 116 civilians, including 27 children.

At the end of October 1992, the Croatian National Defence Council commissioned a report into the loss of Bosanska Posavina. It found that the front had a major strategic role in binding strong VRS forces and prevented their detachment to other parts of the country. However, the commission concluded that there was no unified political and military objective in Bosanska Posavina and the defence was burdened by internal conflicts and accusations. It found that the chain of command did not operate as intended, at times commanders at lower levels received instructions without the knowledge of higher command. The counterintelligence agencies were also criticized as ineffective, while rumors about a betrayal had a negative impact on the morale of the army, for which they accused a "fifth column". According to former Croatian prime minister Josip Manolić the report "clearly indicated the responsibility of Gojko Šušak, and of his separate military and political lines [of command] on the ground, for the fall of Posavina."

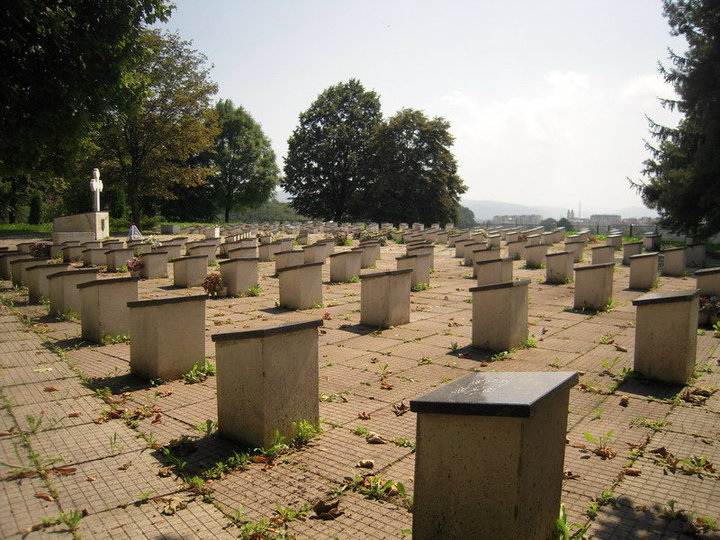
The Memorial Center to the fallen fighters of the 2nd Krajina Brigade

The outcome of the battle shocked the Croatian commander and later resulted in speculation about its cause. Stipetić blamed the 108th Infantry Brigade for the collapse of the Bosanski Brod bridgehead and the failure of the defence. He claimed the brigade had been pulled back from the battlefield by civilian authorities in Slavonski Brod and thought the outcome of the battle was predetermined by the Graz agreement of the Bosnian Serb and Bosnian Croat leaders, Radovan Karadžić and Mate Boban. General Karl Gorinšek, commander in charge of defending neighboring Slavonia during Posavina's fall, said that the Croatian administration showed no interest in defending Posavina and that he continuously got orders to not take any initiative in defending the territory. Stipetić's view regarding the Graz agreement is echoed by British historian Marko Attila Hoare, who claims that the area conceded by the Croats during Operation Corridor 92 was traded for western Herzegovina. On the other hand, Croatian-American historian James J. Sadkovich, among others, described that view as a conspiracy theory. While some sources have proposed that the area was traded for the JNA-held Prevlaka Peninsula near Dubrovnik, a Central Intelligence Agency analysis concluded that there is no direct evidence of such arrangements.

Conversely, Croatian historian Davor Marijan concluded that the battle was too complex for the HV and especially for the HVO. He also pointed out that the HV and HVO suffered from ineffective command structures and poor intelligence, noting that they had failed to detect the presence of the VRS 16th Motorised and the 1st Armoured brigades early on. Marijan also claims the HV had demobilised ten infantry brigades shortly before the battle, and his view is supported by Colonel General Novica Simić, commander of the VRS 16th Motorised Brigade, assigned to Tactical Group 1, which had been established by the 1st Krajina Corps to carry out the offensive.

In 2001–03, three Bosnian Serb officials were tried by the International Criminal Tribunal for the former Yugoslavia for war crimes committed after the capture of Bosanski Šamac. The defendants, Blagoje Simić, Miroslav Tadić and Simo Zarić, were charged with unlawful arrest, detention, beatings, torture, forced labour, deportation and forcible transfer. The three were found guilty, and the convictions upheld in the appeals process. Simić was sentenced to 15 years in prison, while Tadić and Zarić received prison terms of eight and six years respectively.

In 2017, Azra Bašić was sentenced on 14 years in prison for war crimes against Serb war prisoners in Derventa before the operation.

== See also ==
- 1992 Yugoslav People's Army column incident in Tuzla
- Sijekovac killings
- Battle of Orašje
