= Operation Lukavac '93 =

Military operation during the Bosnian War

Lukavac '93
- Part of the Bosnian War
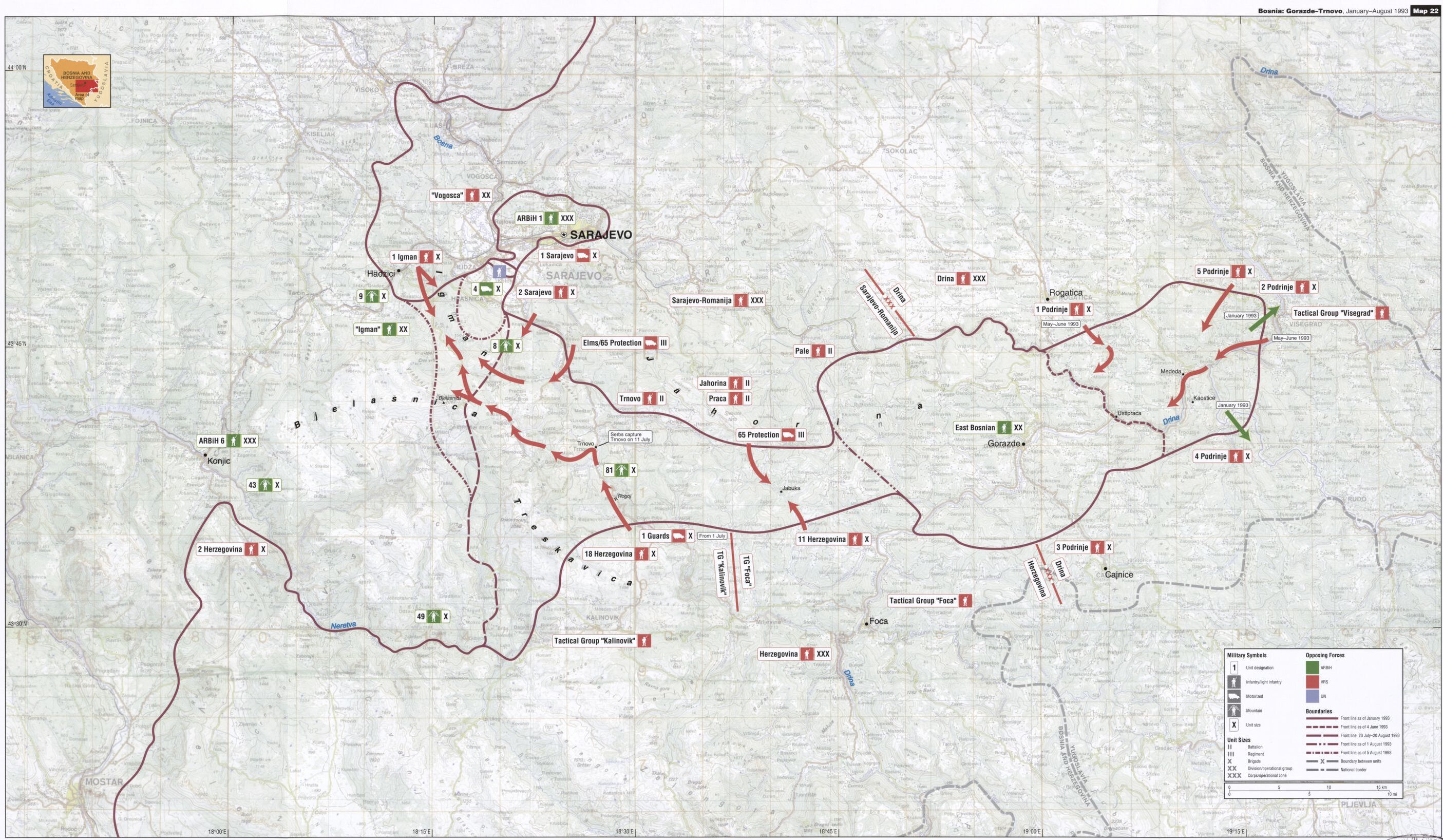
- A map of the Operations
Date	2 July – 19 August 1993
Location	Trnovo, Mount Igman, Mount Bjelašnica, south of Sarajevo
Result	Army of Republika Srpska victory: The VRS secures the Rogoj and Grebak passes; VRS takes control over Trnovo, Igman, Bjelašnica and Treskavica; Start of the Siege of Goražde

Belligerents
Republika Srpska	Republic of Bosnia and Herzegovina

Commanders and leaders
Ratko Mladić	Rasim Delić

Units involved
Army of Republika Srpska: 1st Guards Brigade; 65th Protection Regiment; Garda Panteri	Army of the Republic of Bosnia and Herzegovina: 1st Corps

Strength
10,000	8,000–8,500

Casualties and losses
Unknown	Unknown

Operation "Lukavac '93" (Serbo-Croatian: Operacija "Lukavac '93", Операција "Лукавац '93") was carried out by the Army of Republika Srpska (VRS), commanded by Lieutenant colonel general Ratko Mladić, against the Army of the Republic of Bosnia and Herzegovina (ARBiH) during the Bosnian War. Their objectives were to create a direct link between the Bosnian Serb-held Herzegovina region and the rest of Republika Srpska and cut the Republic of Bosnia and Herzegovina supply route to Goražde.

== Background ==
The Serbian goal, throughout 1992–1993, was to besiege and capture the cities of Žepa, Srebrenica and Goražde. A few days before Lukavac '93, Bosnian Muslim militias successfully occupied Trnovo and surrounding mountain ranges which cut communications between Serbian Herzegovina and the rest of Republika Srpska. After Operation Cerska '93, the VRS recaptured most of its lost lands east of Sarajevo, and besieged Žepa and Srebrenica.

== Operation ==
Initially, the ARBiH men count numbered 10,000. However, immediately after the start and successful implementation of the offensive actions of the VRS, the General Staff of the ARBiH sent elements of the 7th Muslim and 17th Krajina Brigades as reinforcements, jointly with a group of troops from the entire First Corps of the ARBiH with the strength of one brigade, making the number grow up to 13,000.

On July 10, Serb forces entered Trnovo, and successfully occupied it on July 11. The Serbs later kept advancing west and reached Igman and Bjelašnica at the beginning of August. The operation was called off with the capture of the Rogoj and Grebak passes, strengthening even more communications between the two parts of Serbian-controlled Republika Srpska.

== Aftermath ==
After this operation, Sarajevo was now fully exposed to eventual Serbian attacks. Because of this, NATO pressured the VRS to withdraw from Igman and Bjelašnica. During these negotiations, between these mountains a Demilitarized zone was called off but was never put in place.
