= Army of Republika Srpska =

Bosnian Serb military force, 1992–2006

- Војска Републике Српске; Vojska Republike Srpske
- Emblem of the Army of Republika Srpska
- Military leader: Ratko Mladić
- Political leader: Radovan Karadžić
- Dates active: 1992–2006
- Split from: Yugoslav People's Army
- Merged into: Armed Forces of Bosnia and Herzegovina
- Allegiance: Republika Srpska
- Headquarters: Pale, Bijeljina, Banja Luka
- Size: 250,000 by formation 155,000 (1995)
- Wars: the Bosnian War and the Croatian War

The Army of Republika Srpska (Serbian: Војска Републике Српске, ВРС, romanized: Vojska Republike Srpske, VRS), commonly referred to in English as the Bosnian Serb Army, was the military of Republika Srpska, the self-proclaimed secessionist republic, a territory within the newly independent Republic of Bosnia and Herzegovina (formerly part of Yugoslavia), which it defied and fought against. Active during the Bosnian War from 1992 to 1995, the Bosnian Serb Army under General Ratko Mladić became the most proficient military force in the Balkans, as well as one of the most reviled armies in the world. After the war it continued to exist as the armed forces of Republika Srpska, one of two entities making up Bosnia and Herzegovina, until 2006 when it was integrated into the Armed Forces of Bosnia and Herzegovina. During the conflict, the Bosnian Serb Army conducted several major operations, including Operation Corridor 92, Operation Vrbas '92, Operation Lukavac, Operation Shield '94, and Operation Spider; The army also took part in the Siege of Sarajevo, the longest siege of a capital city in modern history, as well as in the Srebrenica massacre.

== Personnel ==
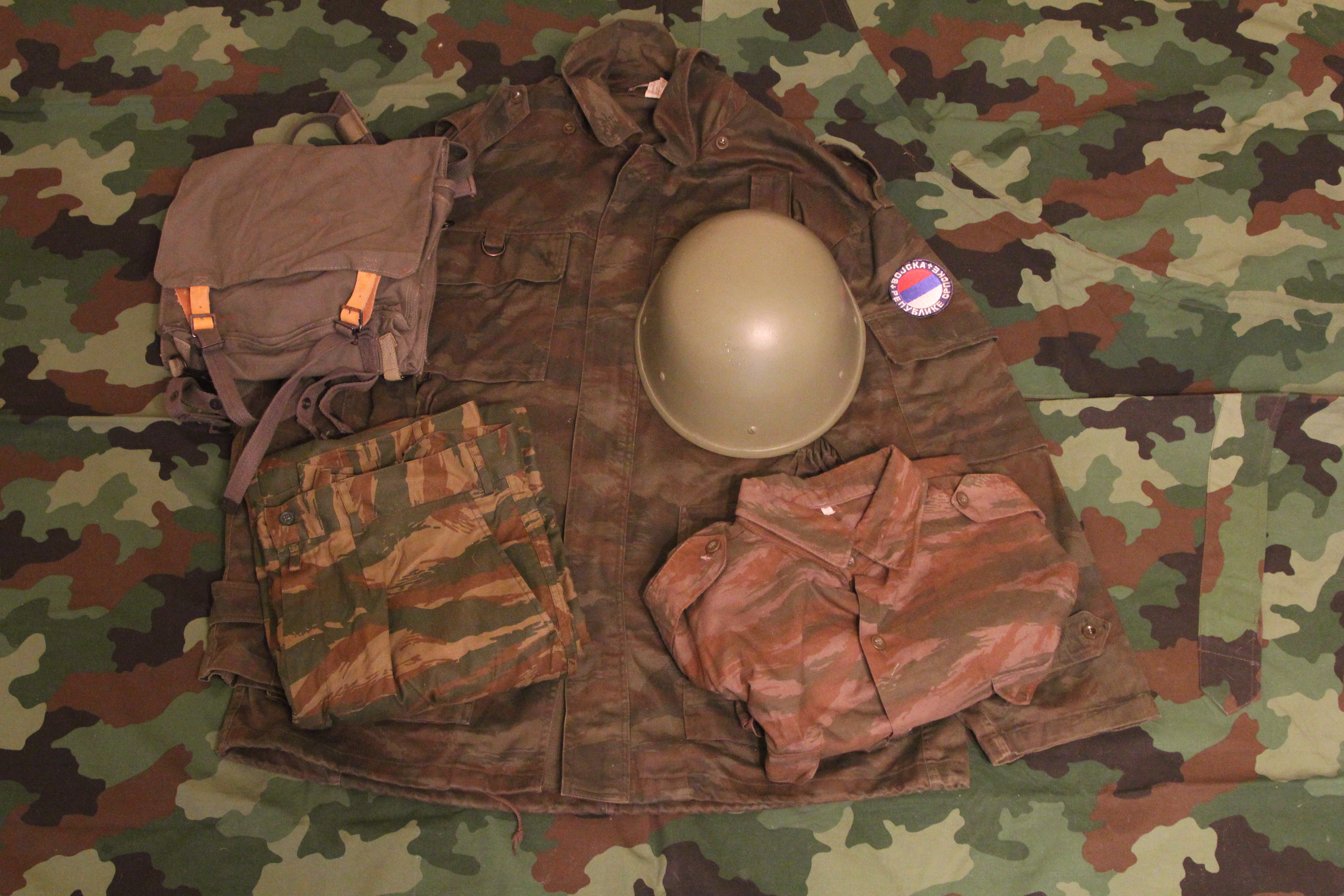
A typical uniform of a VRS member during the 1990s

The Army of the Republika Srpska (VRS) was founded on 12 May 1992 from the remnants of the Yugoslav People's Army (JNA) of the former Socialist Federal Republic of Yugoslavia from which Bosnia and Herzegovina had seceded earlier in 1992. When the Bosnian War erupted, the JNA formally discharged 80,000 Bosnian Serb troops. These troops, who were allowed to keep their heavy weapons, formed the core of what would become the Army of the Republika Srpska, benefiting from access to significant JNA stockpiles and infrastructure.

The VRS was made up largely of ethnic Serbs from Bosnia and Herzegovina, but also attracted around 4,000 foreign Orthodox Christian fighters, many of whom were drawn by nationalist or religious motivations. 700 such fighters came from Russia, and 300–800 from Bulgaria. 100 Greeks also volunteered to fight on the side of the Bosnian Serbs, forming the Greek Volunteer Guard which allegedly participated in the Srebrenica massacre. A number of Romanians and Ukrainians fought as well on the Bosnian Serb side.

== Post-war status and abolishment ==
After the war, the country of Bosnia and Herzegovina had two armies, that of the VRS and the Army of the Federation of Bosnia and Herzegovina (VFBiH). VFBiH was itself composed of two elements, the ARBiH and HVO. The two armies functioned without a common command, on the principle of "non-intervention in the affairs of the other". Bisera Turković noted that it was 'therefore questionable whether in say a foreign attack on Sarajevo [...the VRS] would defend this capital city'. The existence of the two separate armies was one of the factors impeding civil-military relations development. The VRS conducted demining.

In 2003 the army began to integrate into the Armed Forces of Bosnia and Herzegovina. In 2005 a fully integrated unit of Serbs, Bosniaks, and Croats was deployed to augment the US-led coalition forces in Iraq. On 6 June 2006, it was fully integrated into the Armed Forces of Bosnia and Herzegovina controlled by the Ministry of Defence of Bosnia and Herzegovina.

== Leadership ==
The supreme commander of the VRS was General Ratko Mladić. The Command of the Army of Republika Srpska was organized into several key sectors and departments:

- Staff for operational and educative affairs – Major general Manojlo Milovanović (also deputy commander)
- Sector for intelligence and security affairs – Colonel Zdravko Tolimir
- Sector for morale, religious and legal affairs – Major general Milan Gvero
- Sector for rear services – Major general Đorđe Đukić

Closest advisors to General Mladić were Milovanović (operations and planning), Tolimir (intelligence), Gvero (political affairs), and Đukić (logistics). According to opinion of some experts who studied the course of the Bosnian War, the Command of the Main Staff of the Army of Republika Srpska proved to be the most capable military leadership among the participants in the war:

The Main Staff, although composed of various officers arriving from different commands, developed during the war into the most professional staff and planning body among the warring parties in the Bosnian War.

== Military operations ==
Roundel used by Republika Srpska's Militia

- 1992 Yugoslav campaign in Bosnia (3 April – 19 May 1992) – Victory
- Battle of Kupres (1992) (3–11 Apr 1992) against HVO, HOS, HV – Victory
- Operation Jackal (7 – 26 June 1992) against HVO, HV – Defeat
- Operation Corridor 92 (24 Jun – 6 Oct 1992) against HVO, HOS, HV – Victory
- Operation Vrbas '92 (Jun–Oct 1992) against ARBiH, HVO – Victory
- Operation Bura (8–13 Nov 1992) against HVO, HOS, HV – Victory
- Operation Corridor '93 (1–12 Jan 1993) against ARBiH, HVO – Victory
- Operation Cerska '93 (10 Feb – 17 Apr 1993) against ARBiH – Victory
- Operation Sadejstvo (20–27 Jul 1993) against ARBiH – Victory
- Operation Lukavac '93 (2 Jul – 19 Aug 1993) against ARBiH – Victory
- Operation Star '94 (6–18 Apr 1994) against ARBiH, NATO – Victory
- Operation Brana '94 (1 Jun – 5 Jul 1994) against ARBiH – Victory
- Operation Breza '94 (4–12 Sept 1994) against ARBiH – Defeat
- Battle of Kupres (1994) (3 Nov 1994) against ARBiH, HVO – Defeat
- Operation Autumn '94 (11–20 Nov 1994) against ARBiH – Victory
- Operation Shield '94 (4–20 Nov 1994) against ARBiH – Victory
- Operation Spider (16 Nov – 17 Dec 1994) against ARBiH – Victory
- Operation Tekbir '95 (15–28 Jun 1995) against ARBiH – Victory
- Operation Krivaja '95 (6–11 Jul 1995) against ARBiH – Victory
- Operation Stupčanica '95 (25–26 July 1995) against ARBiH – Victory
- Operation Summer '95 (25–29 Jul 1995) against HV, HVO – Defeat
- Operation Mistral 2 (8–15 Sep 1995) against HV, HVO – Defeat
- Operation Sana (13 Sep – 13 Oct 1995) against ARBiH – Defeat
- Operation Una (18–19 Sep) against HV – Victory
- Operation Southern Move (8–11 Oct 1995) against HV, HVO – Defeat
- Operation Prijedor '95 (12–20 Oct 1995) against ARBiH – Victory

File:Garda VRS.png== Special units ==

- 1st Guards Motorized Brigade (Прва гардијска моторизована бригада), General Staff
- 65th Protection Motorized Regiment (65. заштитни моторизовани пук), General Staff
- "Panthers" Special Guards Brigade (Garda Panteri) (Специјална бригада Гарда Пантери), East-Bosnian Corps
- Wolves of the Drina, or Drina Wolves (Вукови са Дрине), Drina Corps
- Special Unit "Peša" (Специјална Јединица "Пеша"), East-Bosnian Corps
- Special Unit "Mando" (Специјална Јединица "Мандо"), East-Bosnian Corps
- Special Unit "Osmaci" (Специјална Јединица "Осмаци"), Drina Corps
- Serb Guard Ilidža (Српска Гарда Илиџа), Sarajevo-Romanija Corps
- White Wolves (Бели Вукови), Sarajevo-Romanija Corps
- Bileća Volunteers (Билећки Добровољци), Herzegovina Corps

== Organization ==
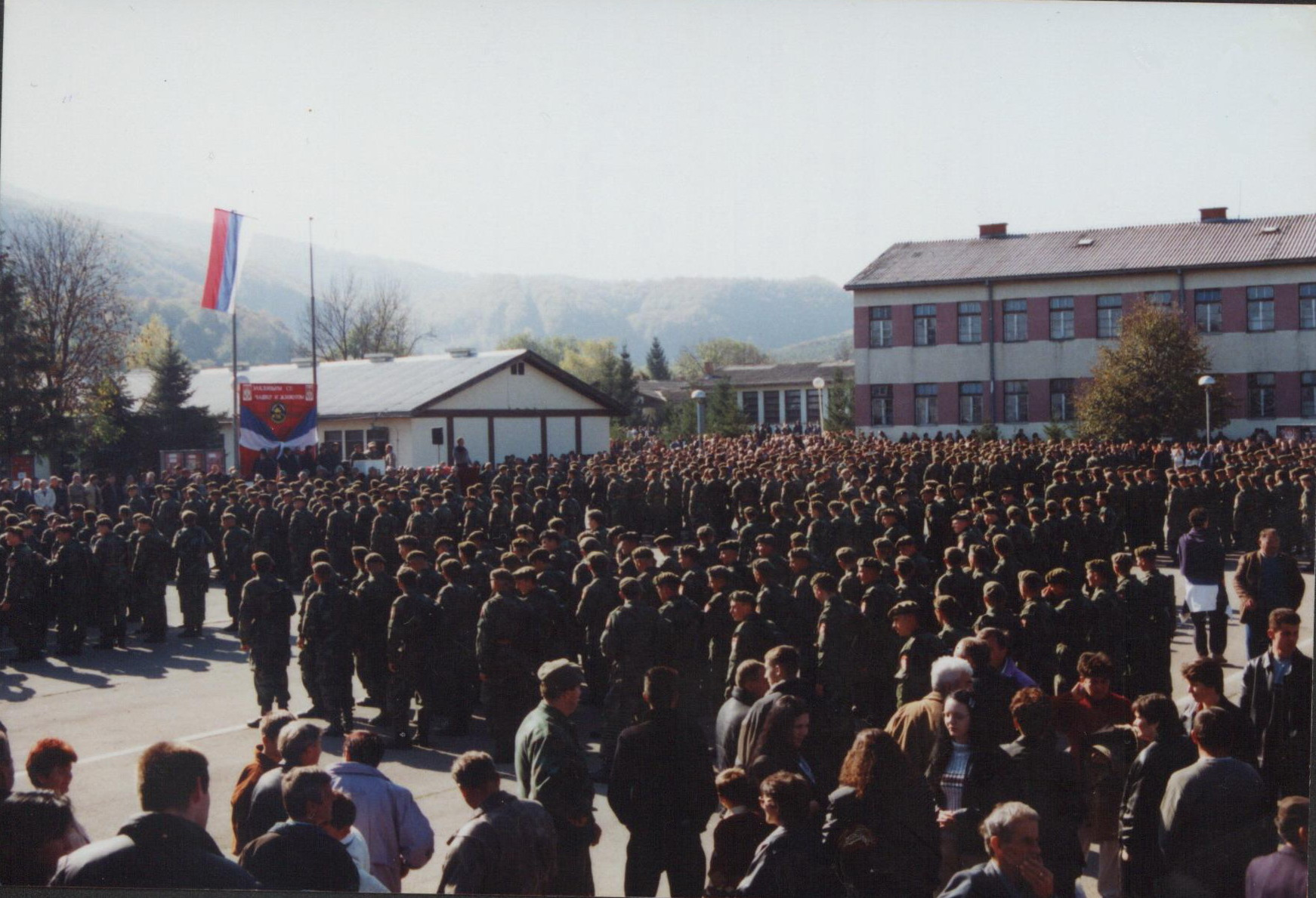
Oath-taking Ceremony in 2001 at the Manjača Military Range

The International Criminal Tribunal for the former Yugoslavia stated that:

"In July 1995, the Armed Forces of the Republika Srpska were under the command and control of the Commander-in-Chief, Radovan Karadžić. His headquarters was in Pale.

Within the framework of the VRS, immediately subordinate to the Commander-in-Chief, was the Main Staff of the VRS, headquartered in Han Pijesak and commanded by General Ratko Mladić. It was the responsibility of the Commander of the Main Staff to issue regulations, orders and instructions regarding the implementation of orders by the Commander-in-Chief, and to discharge the command duties delegated to him by the Commander-in-Chief. The Main Staff of the VRS consisted of staff officers and staff support personnel, as well as some specialised military units such as the 65th Protection Regiment, designed to provide protection and combat services for the Main Staff; and the 10th Sabotage Detachment, a unit trained for operations behind enemy lines and other special combat assignments.

The vast majority of the fighting force of the VRS itself was divided into six geographically-based Corps, all subordinate to, and under the command of, General Mladić and, in turn, the Commander-in-Chief, Radovan Karadzic. In July 1995, the six Corps were the Drina Corps, the 1st Krajina Corps, the 2nd Krajina Corps, the Sarajevo-Romanija Corps, the Hercegovina Corps and the East Bosnia Corps."

=== 1993 ===
- 1st Krajina Corps – Banja Luka
- 2nd Krajina Corps – Drvar
- 3rd Corps – Bijeljina
- East Bosnia Corps – Han Pijesak
- Herzegovina Corps – Bileća

=== 1995 ===
- 1st Krajina Corps – Banja Luka
- 2nd Krajina Corps – Drvar
- East Bosnia Corps – Bijeljina
- Sarajevo-Romanija Corps – Pale
- Drina Corps – Vlasenica
- Herzegovina Corps – Bileća

=== 2001 ===
- 1st Corps – Banja Luka
- 3rd Corps – Bijeljina
- 5th Corps – Sokolac
- 7th Corps – Bileća

== Equipment ==
=== Tanks and armoured vehicles ===
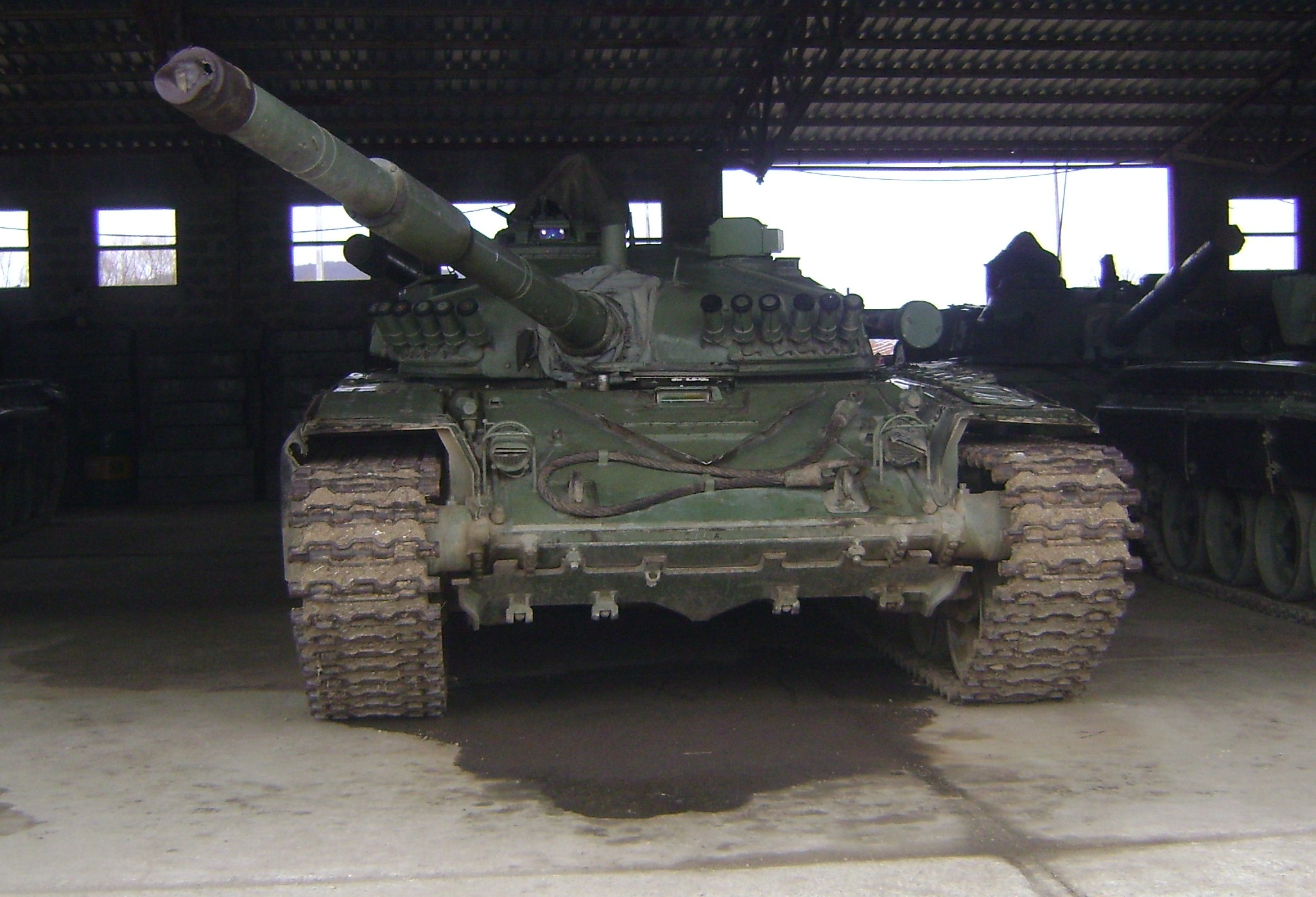
M-84 main battle tank of VRS

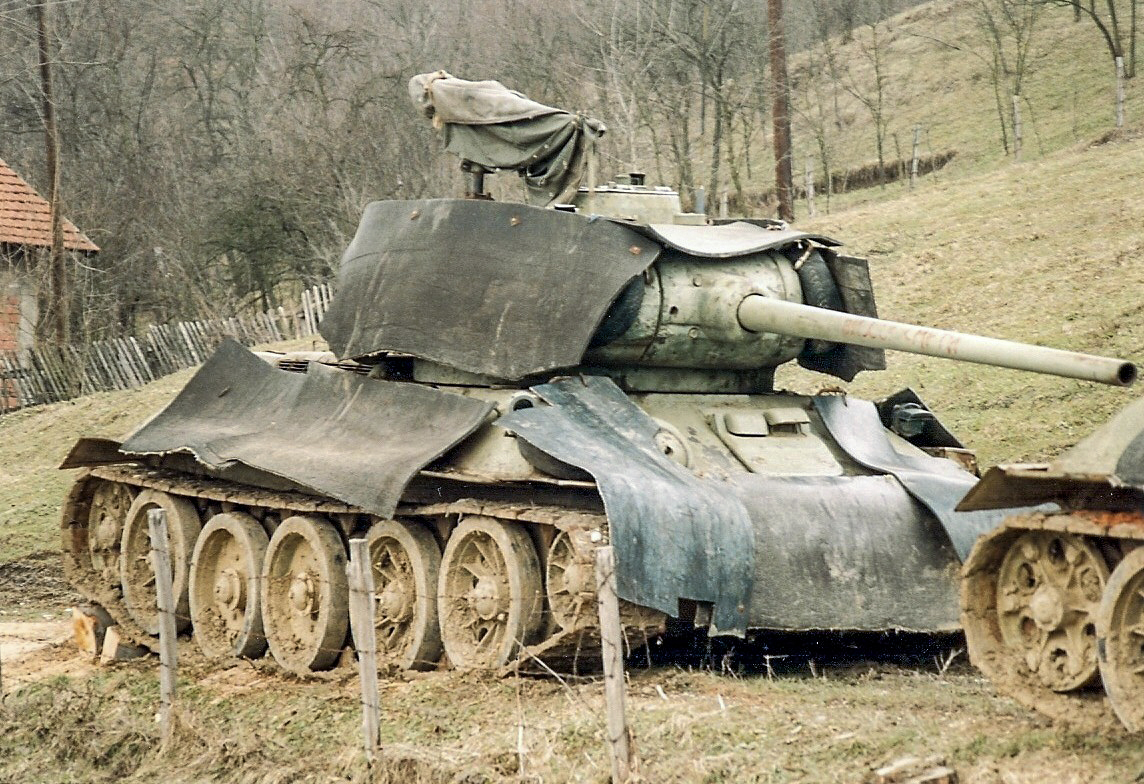
T-34

- M-84 — 200
- T-54/T-55 — 55
- T-34 — 45
- BVP M-80
- OT M-60
- BTR-50
- BOV
- M47 Patton

=== Towed artillery ===
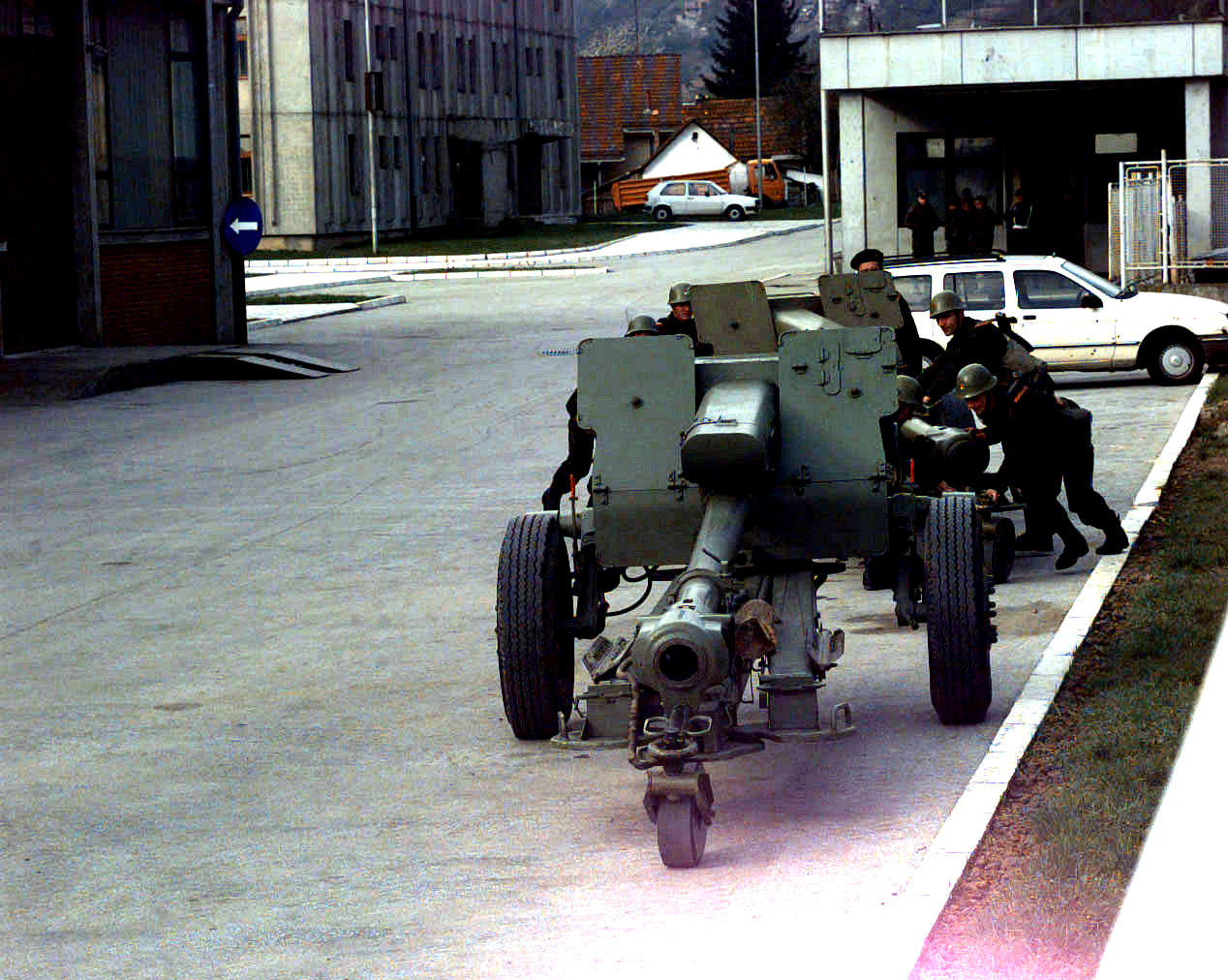
D-30

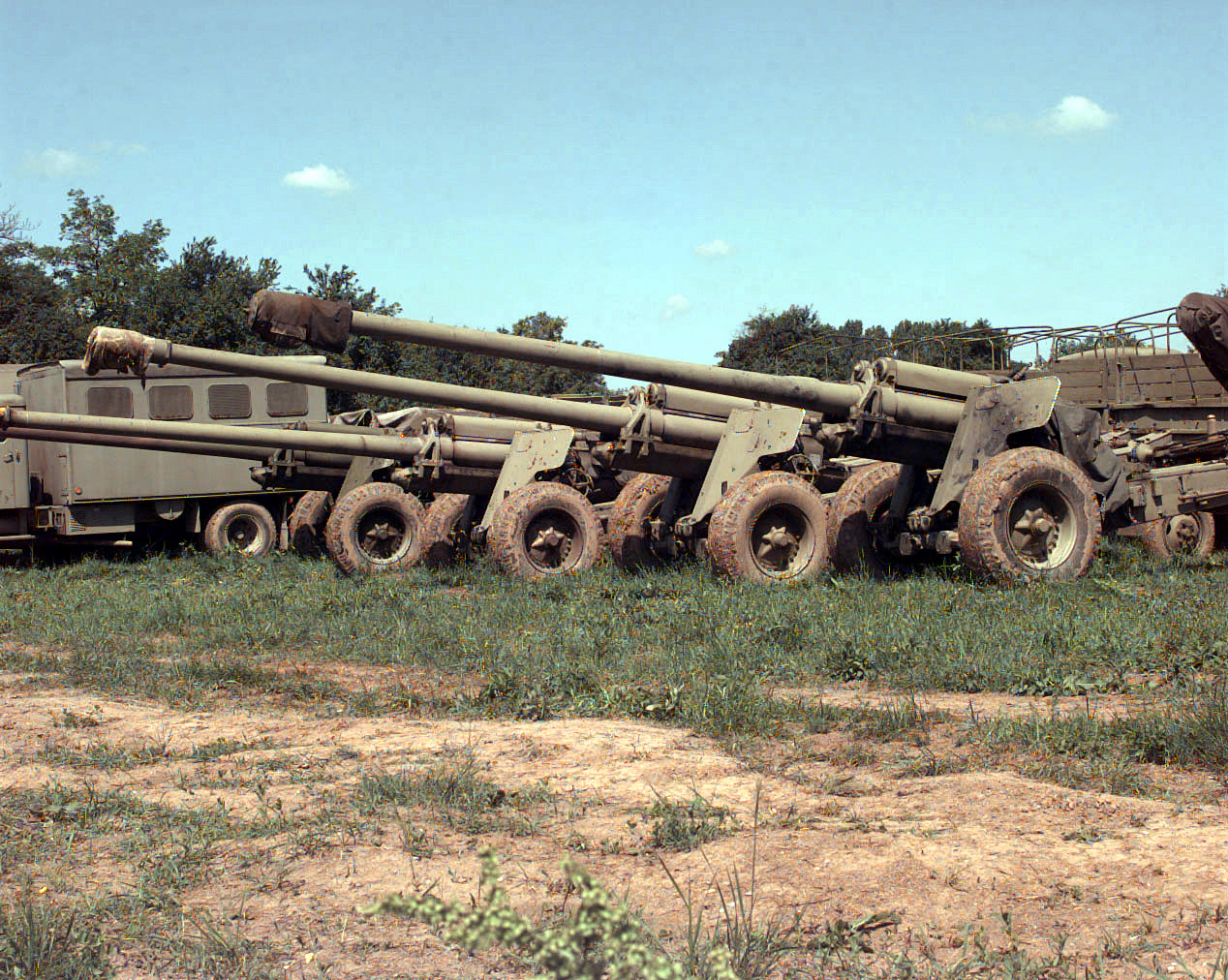
M-46

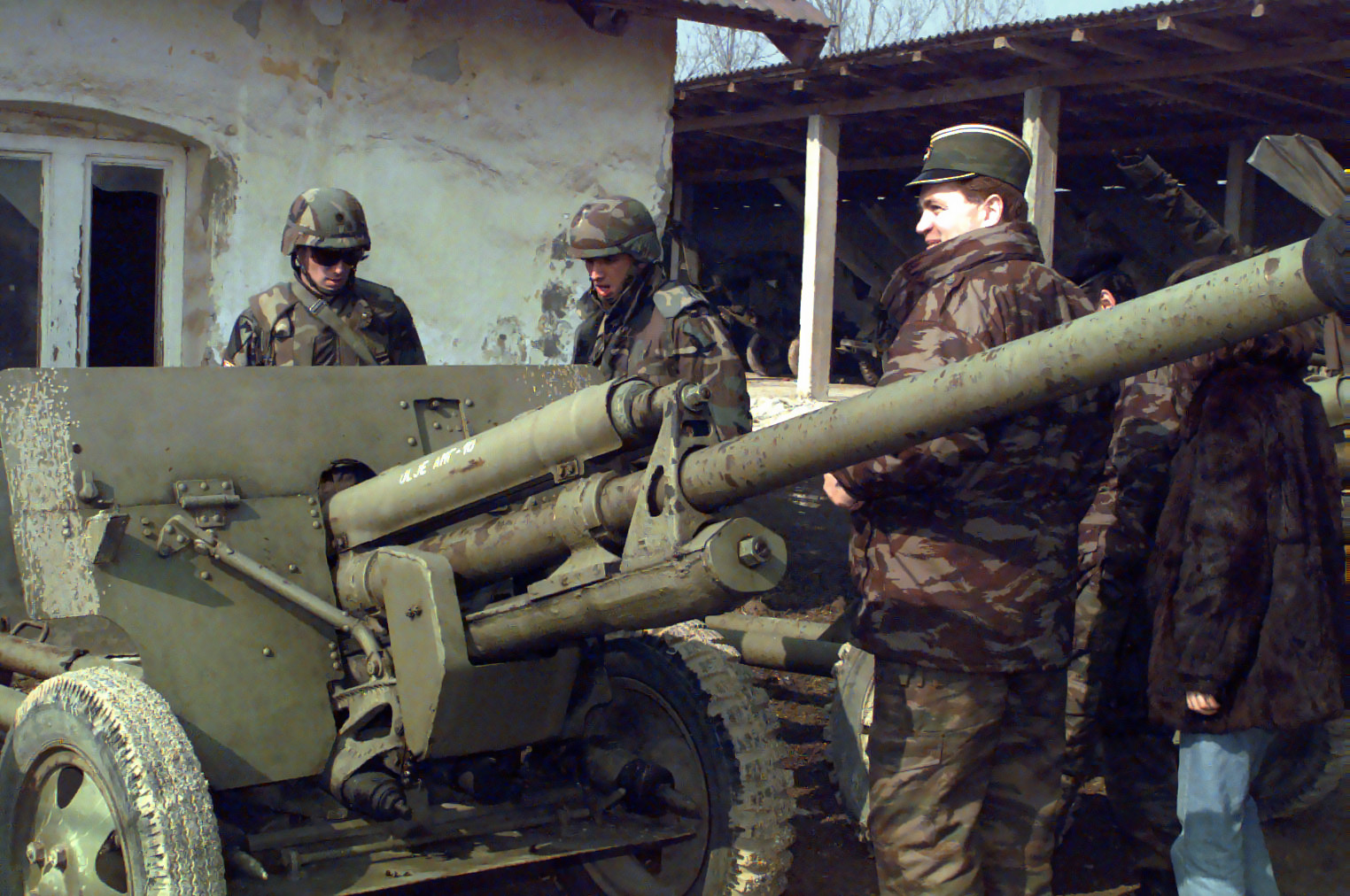
ZiS-3

- M-56
- D-30
- M-30
- M-46
- D-20
- M-84
- M1
- ZiS-3

=== Self-propelled artillery ===
- 2S1 Gvozdika

=== MLRS ===
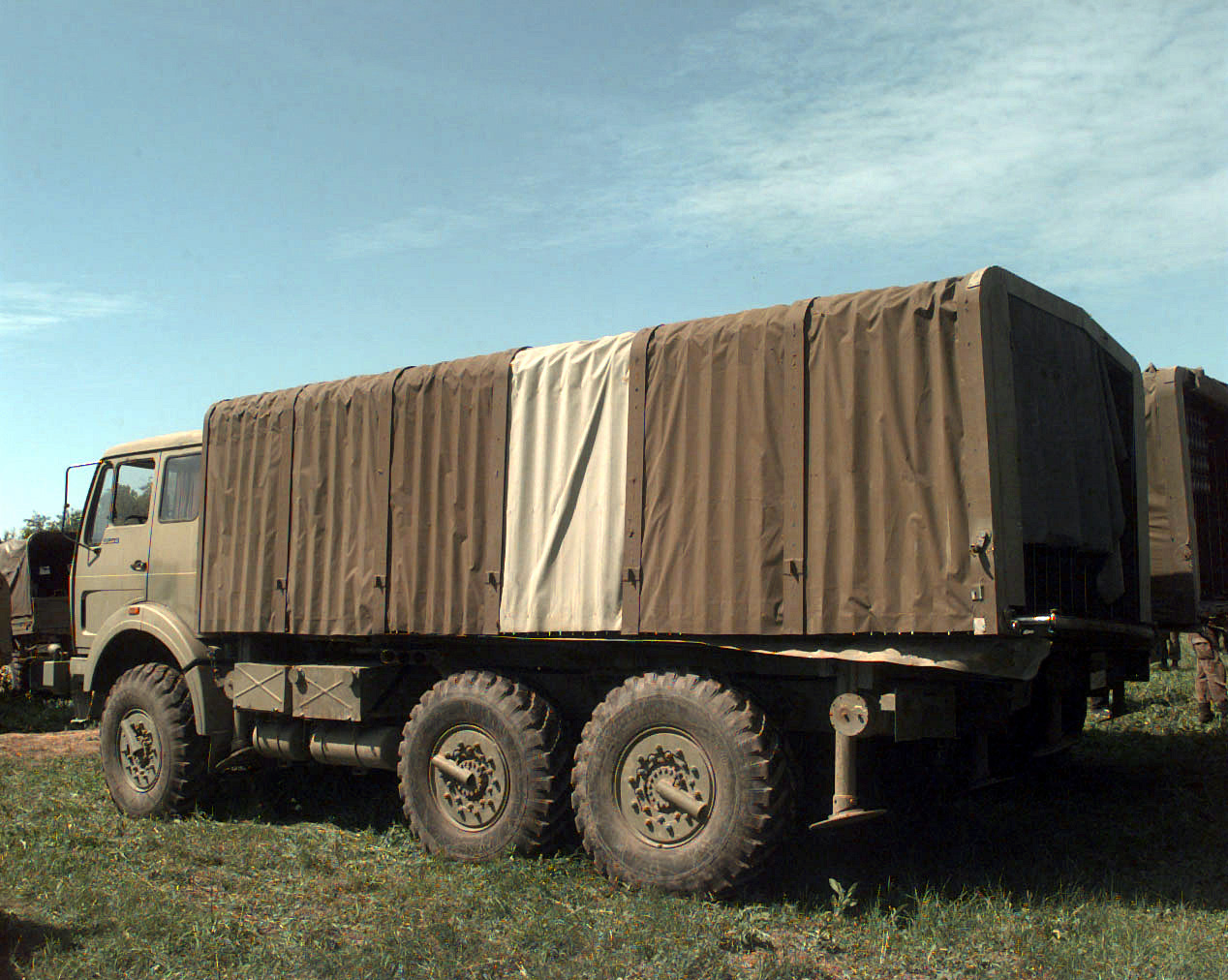
M-77 Oganj MLRs of VRS

- M-63 Plamen
- M-77 Oganj
- M-87 Orkan

=== ATGM ===
- AT-3 "Sagger" and AT-5 "Konkurs"

=== Antitank guns ===
- T-12

=== Self-Propelled Anti-Aircraft Guns (SPAAG) ===
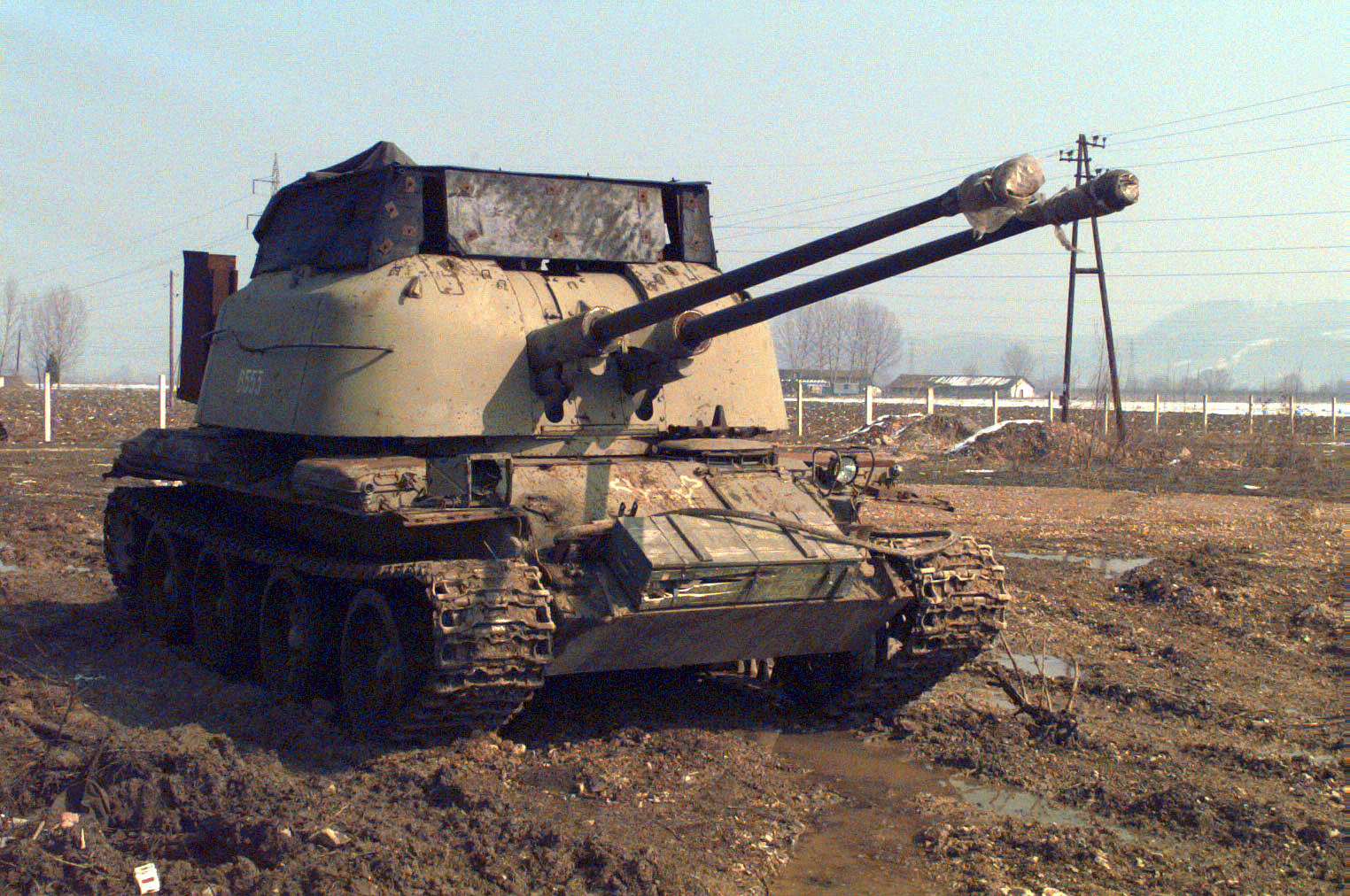
ZSU-57-2

- ZSU-57-2
- M53/59 Praga
- BOV-3
- ZU-23-2

=== MANPADs and SAMs ===
- SA-7
- SA-18
- SA-6
- SA-9

=== Infantry weapons ===
==== Pistols ====
- Zastava M88
- Zastava M57
- CZ99

==== Assault rifles ====
- Zastava M70
- Zastava M80
- Zastava M90

==== Battle rifles ====
- Zastava M77 B1

==== Submachine guns ====
- Zastava M56
- Zastava M85
- Zastava M92
- Heckler & Koch MP5

==== Machine guns ====
- Zastava M53
- Zastava M77
- Zastava M72
- Zastava M84
- Zastava M87
- PKM
- M2 Browning

==== Sniper rifles ====
- Zastava M76
- Zastava M91

==== Anti-tank weapons ====
- M79 Osa
- M80 Zolja

== Republika Srpska Air Force ==
Formerly known as Ratno Vazduhoplovstva i Protiv Vazdušna Odbrana Vojske Republike Srpske or RV i PVO RS. Beginning on 1 June 2004, the Republika Srpska Air Force was officially called, Prvi Puk Vazduhoplovstva i Protiv Vazdušna Odbrana Vojske Republike Srpske, also known as 1st Aviation Regiment and Air Defence Force of the Republic of Srpska's Army.

== See also ==
- Military ranks of Republika Srpska

== Bibliography ==
- Innes, Michael A. (2006). Bosnian Security after Dayton: New Perspectives. Routledge. ISBN 9780203969014.
- Koknar, Ali M. (14 July 2003). "The Kontraktniki : Russian mercenaries at war in the Balkans". Bosnian Institute. Archived from the original on 4 March 2016.
- Ramet, Sabrina P. (2010). Central and Southeast European Politics Since 1989. Cambridge University Press. ISBN 9781139487504.
- Thomas, Nigel (2006). The Yugoslav Wars (2): Bosnia, Kosovo and Macedonia 1992–2001. Osprey Publishing. ISBN 9781841769646.
