= Drina Wolves =

Bosnian Serb army unit, 1992 to 1995

- Vukovi sa Drine
- Active: 1992–1995
- Country: Republika Srpska
- Branch: Army of Republika Srpska
- Type: Paramilitary police
- Garrison/HQ: Zvornik
- Engagements: Bosnian War; Operation Lukavac '93; Battle of Orašje; Siege of Sarajevo; Operation Stupčanica '95; Operation Krivaja '95; Operation Shield 94; Operation Vaganj 95

Commanders
- Notable commanders: Mile Stanošević †; Duško Vukotić; Milan Jolović (WIA)

The Drina Wolves (Serbian Cyrillic: Вукови са Дрине, Vukovi sa Drine) was an elite Special police unit a part of the Army of Republika Srpska (Vojska Republike Srpske – VRS), it was a part of the VRS brigade Drina Corps, and detachment of the Drina Corps the 1st Zvornik Brigade. It was established by Milenko Živanović, early In May 1992, with contingents of volunteers from the Podrinje region, Special police, and the local Territorial Defense as its personnel. however as the war continued, the unit suffered casualties, so replacements were pulled primarily through the regular mobilization channels of the 1st Zvornik Brigade. At its establishment it served as a reconnaissance platoon, but would eventually become the Podrinje Special Forces Detachment (POSS) specializing in Maneuver warfare and other multi-purpose combat. Mile Stanošević was the initial commander of the unit until he was Killed in action in 1992. Duško Vukotić and Milan Jolović would proceed him. The unit took part in numerous military engagements during the Bosnian War. It was formally disbanded in 1995 following the Dayton Agreement, and was integrated into the post-war Bosnian Serb army.

== Background ==
Following the declaration of independence by the Republic of Bosnia and Herzegovina in March 1992, ethnic tensions among Bosniaks, Bosnian Serbs, and Bosnian Croats escalated into a war between all parties. As Yugoslavia fragmented, the Yugoslav People's Army (Jugoslavenska narodna armija – JNA) restructured along ethnic lines. Rather than fully withdrawing, the JNA transferred all of their massive stashes of heavy weaponry, equipment, and locally recruited personnel to the newly emerging self proclaimed Bosnian Serb state, effectively creating a separate military for the Bosnian Serbs.

On 12 May 1992, the Bosnian Serb assembly officially established the Army of Republika Srpska (Vojska Republike Srpske – VRS). Thousands of regular JNA officers and soldiers stationed in Bosnia were predominantly ethnic Serbs, and they were formally discharged from the Yugoslav People's Army yet remained in place, easily integrating into the VRS with their existing weapons and general command intact.

To secure territories along the Drina river valley bordering Serbia, a primary objective aimed at eliminating the territorial separation between Serb territories, the Drina Corps was formally established on 1 November 1992 as one of the six corps of the VRS. Headquartered in Vlasenica and incorporating a strength of roughly 18,000 personnel, the corps was made up of various local Territorial Defense units and independent tactical brigades to defend its area of responsibility, and to conduct military operations throughout the Podrinje region.

== Service ==
The first major engagement Wolves of the Drina took part in was Operation Lukavac '93, along with the Army of Republika Srpska (Vojska Republike Srpske – VRS), they would successfully capture the Igman plateau and surrounding areas, and would further escalate the Siege of Goražde after a renewed offensive would be launched in January 1993. During the operation, it is alleged that Milan Jolović, Drina Wolves commander saved Ratko Mladić's life, which garnered him the nickname "Legend" (Serbian Cyrillic: Легенда, Legenda). In November 1994, Wolves of the Drina was a part of Tactical Group 3 (TG-3) spearheaded by the 3rd Serbian Brigade during the Army of Republika Srpska conducted offensive Operation Shield '94. They fought along the Bihać-Petrovac roadway and would recapture the town of Ripač and other towns in the vicinity lost in Operation Grmeč 94.

The unit would be deployed to the Srebrenica encalve in July 1995 as part of the 1st Zvornik Brigade's Tactical Group for preparations for Operation Krivaja '95, which would separate the Srebrenica and Žepa enclaves apart from each other, with Srebrenica itself being completely captured by the Army of Republika Srpska and its belligerents. During Operation Krivaja 95, the unit saw action at Dutchbat Observation Post "Foxtrot", resulting in the capture of the Observation Post. Following the capture of Srebrenica, remnants of the ARBiH 28th Brigade fled toward the area of responsibility of the 1st Zvornik Brigade, on July 15 through 16, the Drina Wolves would engage the ARBiH 28th Brigade as they planned to escape to allied ARBiH territories, the Drina Wolves and the Zvornik Brigade saw some success in stopping the Operation, however a ceasefire was agreed upon. As operations in Srebrenica ensued, other members of the unit were participating in combat operations nearby Sarajevo. In the same region where Operation Krivaja 95 took place, they would participate in the seizure of the Žepa, operating in the northwestern sector of the enclave during Operation Stupčanica '95. In addition to maneuver warfare, the unit also specialized in the combat of Anti-aircraft, mixed and light artillery, also serving as a rear brigade and even having its own engineering and communication companies. The Drina wolves were regarded as being a well trained and elite unit of the VRS. During the Battle of Orašje (codenamed:Operation Flame-95, Plamen-95), the Drina Wolves acted as reinforcements for the operation, adding on to colonel Dragoslav Djurkic's Tactical Group 5 (TG-5) numbering 8,000 in total.

== Involvement in Srebrenica Massacare ==
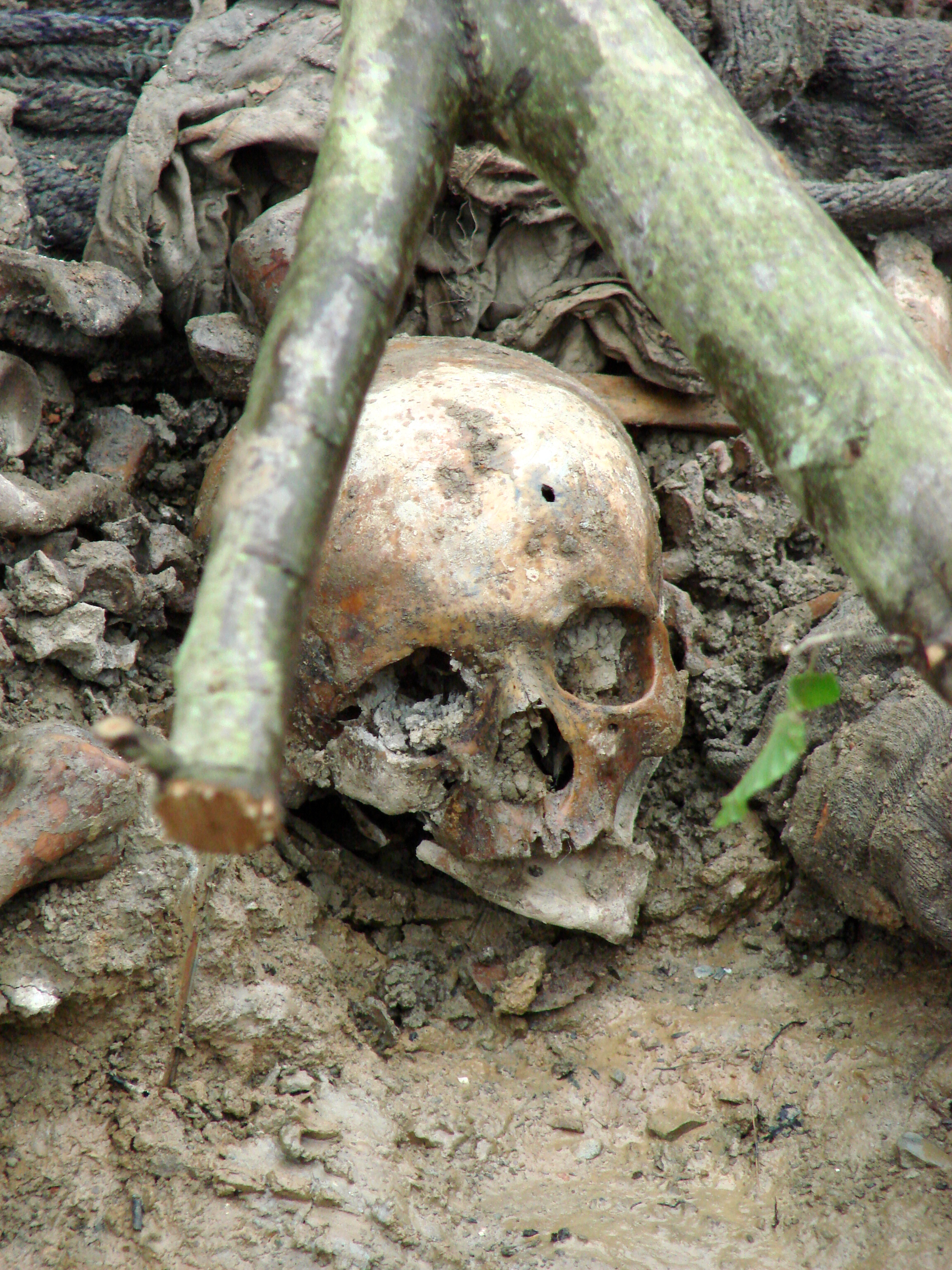
Srebrenica Massacre - Exhumed Victim with a visible bullet entry point in the cranium.

On July 11, 1995, following the capture of multiple Dutchbat observation posts and shelling of Srebrenica, the Drina Wolves, accompanied by the 10th Sabotage and Bratunac Brigades would enter Srebrenica.

== Sources ==
- Central Intelligence Agency, Office of Russian and European Analysis (2002). Balkan Battlegrounds: A Military History of the Yugoslav Conflict, 1990–1995. Washington, D.C.: Central Intelligence Agency. ISBN 978-0160664724.
