= Dutchbat =

United Nations battalion in the Bosnian war

- 1(NL)VN Infanteriebataljon
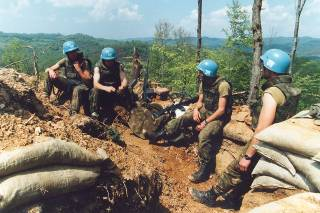
- Active: 1994–1995
- Country: Netherlands
- Role: Peacekeeping
- Size: ~450
- Part of: United Nations
- Colors: Blue
- Engagements: Bosnian War: Siege of Srebrenica

Commanders
- Notable commanders: Lt. Col. Thom Karremans

Dutchbat (short for "Dutch Battalion") was a Dutch battalion under the command of the United Nations in operation UNPROFOR. It was hastily formed out of the emerging 11th Airmobile Brigade between February 1994 and November 1995 to participate in peacekeeping operations. It was tasked to execute United Nations Security Council Resolution 819 in the Bosnian Muslim enclaves and the designated UN "safe havens" of Srebrenica and Žepa during the Bosnian War.

In July 1995, as the Army of Republika Srpska forces came to take over the enclave, the Dutchbat were vastly outnumbered and were far too lightly equipped to repel the more heavily armed Bosnian Serb troops. It also had its request for air support from UNPROFOR denied. Subsequently, the Bosnian Serb forces led Srebrenica's Bosniak male inhabitants into the mountains, where thousands of them were massacred. Despite their efforts to secure peace in the area, the enclave fell into Serb hands. In 2016, several veterans of the battalion, with approval of its commander, sued the Dutch government for "severe negligence and carelessness" regarding the mission.

== Operation ==
Dutchbat was a Dutch army battalion. Its mission consisted of deploying four successive rotations, each of around 450 persons, named Dutchbat I, II, III and IV. The Dutchbat troops were armed with personal weapons, machine guns and two anti-tank RPGs in accordance with the mandate of UNPROFOR. The headquarters were installed in an old battery factory in Potočari, 5 km (3.1 mi) away from Srebrenica. The Dutchbat used 30 observation posts throughout the perimeter of the enclave, mostly consisting of a sandbagged armored car and associated personnel and equipment.

Dutchbat was given the mission to execute United Nations Security Council Resolution 819 in the Bosnian Muslim enclave, which was dubbed a "safe area." The Rules of Engagement stated that the peacekeepers could use force for self-defence only, and intervening in the fighting was forbidden to all NATO and UN troops. To counter this, they relied on air support from NATO. In accordance to the resolution phrase 10, it demanded that all parties ensure the safety of the Protection Force, UN personnel and other international organisations. The main force of the Dutchbat was stationed in the Srebrenica enclave. The Dutchbat's zone fell under siege by the Bosnian Serb forces when NATO air forces began bombing besieged Sarajevo.

== Events ==
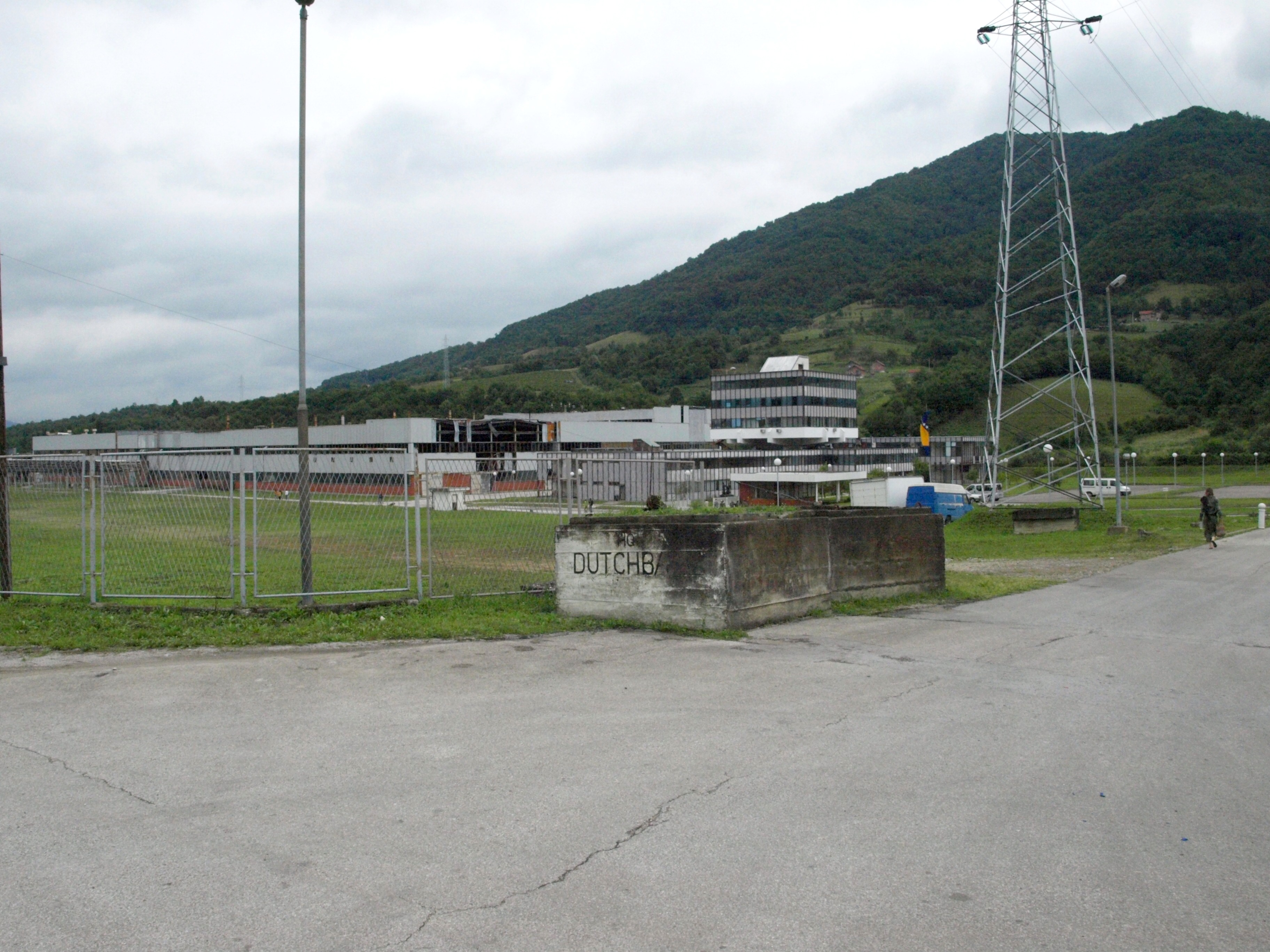
Former Dutchbat area in Potočari, pictured in 2008

Described as "a sleepy cul de sac" because of its geographic location in a valley enclosed by hills and mountains, the Srebrenica enclave was easily blockaded by the Army of Republika Srpska forces, isolating the Dutchbat, causing serious deficiencies in provisions. When the VRS artillery weakened the resistance of the 28th Mountain Infantry Division that was defending the town, Thom Karremans made an urgent request for air support from the UN for two Dutch F-16s to attack the heavy armor of the VRS. The attack never took place. It was allegedly cancelled when Serb forces threatened to execute 50 members of Dutchbat III who had been seized as hostages.

On 8 July, a Dutch YPR-765 armored vehicle took fire from the Serbs and withdrew. A group of Bosniaks demanded that the armored vehicle stay to defend them, and established a makeshift barricade to prevent its retreat. As the armored vehicle continued to withdraw, a Bosniak farmer who was manning the barricade threw a hand grenade onto it and subsequently killed Dutch soldier Raviv van Renssen.

During the third rotation, Dutchbat III, commanded by Lieutenant colonel Thom Karremans, Mladić's soldiers took the town on 11 July 1995, causing the displacement of many of the city's inhabitants. About 15,000 displaced persons undertook the flight towards Tuzla on foot, but the majority looked for protection from the UN blue helmets in Potočari. Mladić met with Karremans and there it was agreed that the enclaves would be handed over to the VRS. Under the pretext of evacuating the Bosniak population to a sheltered city, most of the women and children were transferred by bus to a zone under Bosnian Serb control. The Serbs assured Karremans that the men would be transferred later. But instead, the Serbs proceeded to massacre Srebrenica's male population of approximately 8,373 Bosniaks of different ages.

On 21 July, with the entire zone already under the control of the VRS, the Dutchbat left the enclave. From July until November 1995, Dutchbat IV served and mainly dealt with refugees at Simin Han near Tuzla. On 25 July 1995, the VRS launched Operation Stupčanica 95, aimed at capturing the Bosnian enclave of Žepa. The commander of the peacekeeping unit though, Mykola Verkhohlyad negotiated with general Mladić to secure the evacuation of civilians from Žepa in a UN convoy. Verkhohlyad did not allow them to be taken over by Mladić forces, which helped rescue over 10,000 Bosniak civilians. After the negotiations, the operation started, and resulted 800 refugees and the deaths of 116 in the takeover.

== Consequences ==
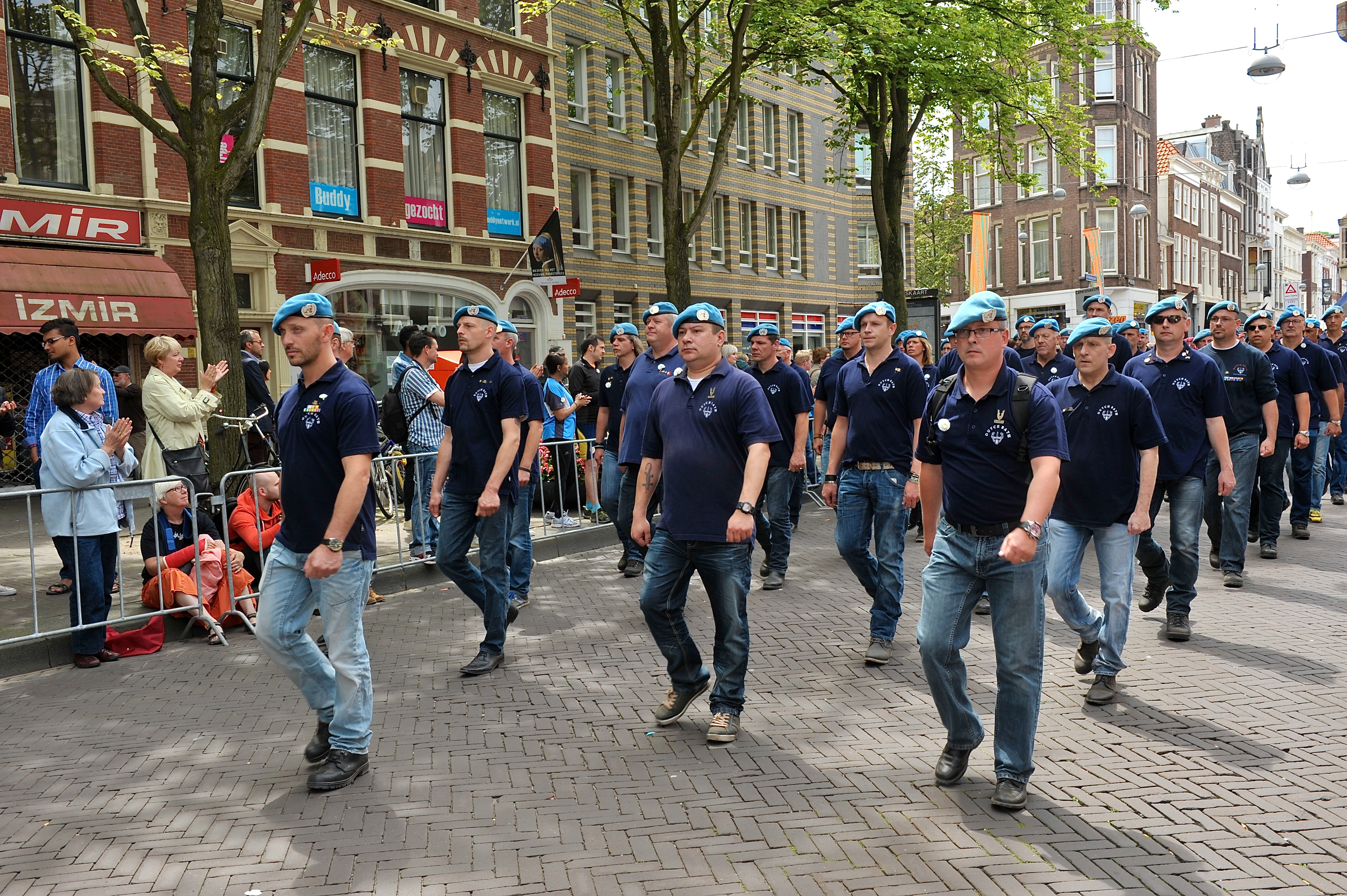
Dutchbat III veterans marching in The Hague on Veterans' Day, 2014

This incident had great impact on public opinion in the Netherlands. An official seven-year investigation of the incident by the Netherlands Institute for War Documentation resulted in the report Srebrenica: a ‘safe’ area, published April 10, 2002, which resulted in the resignation of Prime Minister Wim Kok six days later. The 3,400-page report criticized the political and military High Commands of the Netherlands as being guilty of criminal negligence, for not preventing the massacre. The conclusions were devastating:

- The mission was not suitably prepared.
- There was no coordination between the Ministry of Defence (under Joris Voorhoeve) and the Ministry of Foreign Affairs (under Hans van Mierlo).
- The contingent did not receive sufficient means to accomplish the mission. Adequate firepower and Forward Air Controllers to direct air attacks were missing.
- The non-Dutch in charge of air support refused to give aid as requested by Karremans.
- The Netherlands and the UN did not perform their duty.

The report has been referred to by international media. The Institute for War and Peace Reporting has labelled the report "controversial". On 4 December 2006, Minister of Defence Henk Kamp gave a remembrance insignia to the soldiers of Dutchbat III, i.e. Draaginsigne DBIII. This award was severely criticized by the public as well as by some survivors and relatives of Srebrenica victims. In June 2007 an association of relatives of the victims of the massacre presented a denunciation in The Hague against the Government of the Netherlands and the UN for its negligence in the massacre.

In October of the same year, twelve former members of Dutchbat III visited the Srebrenica Genocide Memorial, paying tribute to the victims. The same group of relatives opposed their act of atonement to open dialogue. According to testimonies of 171 of the members of the battalion, 65% left the Army, 40% of these requested psychological treatment, and 10% show symptoms of post-traumatic stress disorder (official figure; health professionals treating these people deem the number much higher).
