= Thom Karremans =

Dutch military officer (born 1948)

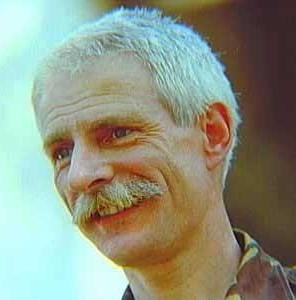
- Karremans in 1995
- Born: 29 November 1948 (age 77); Apeldoorn, Netherlands
- Alma mater: Royal Military Academy
- Spouse: 1
- Military career
- Allegiance: Netherlands
- Branch: Royal Netherlands Army
- Rank: Colonel
- Commands: Commander of Dutchbat
- Conflicts: Lebanese Civil War; Bosnian War; Siege of Srebrenica; Operation Krivaja '95

Thomas Jakob Peter Karremans (born 29 December 1948) is the former commander of Dutchbat troops in Srebrenica at the time of the Srebrenica genocide during the Bosnian War. Dutchbat had been assigned to defend the Bosniak enclave made the U.N. "safe area", but it failed to prevent the Serbs from taking the city.

== Military career ==
Karremans received his military training at the Royal Military Academy in the Netherlands, and he was part of the 1979-1980 UNIFIL peacekeepers in Lebanon. In the 1980s, he was stationed at the NATO Headquarters for SHAPE in Mons, Belgium, where he was involved in arms control. In 1991, Karremans had his first experience in Bosnia as liaison officer to the EC observation committee. He then became commander of an infantry battalion in Assen.

== Presence in the staging area of the Srebrenica genocide ==
In 1994 Karremans was appointed as commander of the Dutchbat III battalion that was deployed to the Srebrenica enclave as a part of the peacekeeping mission, under command of the United Nations in the United Nations Protection Force (UNPROFOR).

On 11, 12, and 13 July 1995, the enclave was captured by Serb soldiers, while the Dutch battalion was stationed there. Karremans failed to follow the orders of General Gobilliard who requested him in writing to defend the enclave. Karremans requested NATO air support to defend the enclave, as the Dutch were driven further into the narrow enclave (Karremans requested air strikes several times, in particular from the French – which was witnessed from neutral Switzerland, but they were first denied, then delayed, and later granted by UN General Bernard Janvier). However the NATO air support arrived was stopped to protect Dutchbat soldiers that were held hostage by Serbian forces.

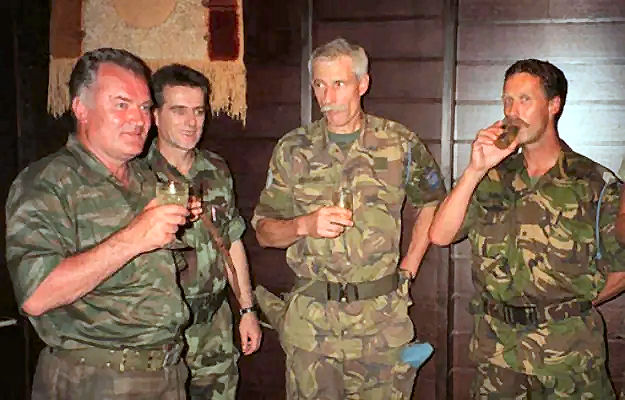
"Toast of shame" - left Mladić, 2nd from right Karremans (July 1995)

After Serbian forces entered Srebrenica, Karremans was interrogated by Serb General Ratko Mladić. During the interrogation, Karremans was confined against a wall and surrounded by Serb soldiers, defensive and submissive, but forced to drink alcohol (a white wine spritzer) by Mladić and, in particular, later had to excuse himself from ever requesting air strikes against Bosnian Serb forces, claiming the decision was made by higher authorities based on information he provided.

Under the pretext of evacuating the Bosniak population to a sheltered city, Serbs transferred most of the women and children by bus to a zone under Bosnian Serb control, claiming that the men would be transferred later.

Karremans has said a Serb blockade had left his soldiers desperately short of food and fuel. He told the Hague ICTY in 1996 that when his requests for NATO air strikes against Bosnian Serb troops were finally granted, they were "too late and too little."

=== Reactions regarding the Dutchbat presence during the attack, occupation and genocide of Srebrenica ===
In 1999, the United Nations admitted its error in expecting a small number of troops to protect the Srebrenica Safe Area.

Karremans has always denied that he was aware of the fact that thousands of Muslim men and boys he saw being taken away by Bosnian Serbs were going to be murdered. At least one Dutchbat member, former Dutch army surgeon Ger Kremers, has stated that he and Karremans watched the men being taken away by Serb forces. Karremans is alleged to have said, "It will not end well with them." Kremer also has accused Karremans of lying under oath to the UN Yugoslavia war crimes tribunal and a Dutch parliamentary inquiry. Also, the Dutch military historian Christ Klep has disputed the commander's account. Klep interviewed dozens of former Dutchbat troops who said they were aware "about the impending genocide."

At a press conference in Zagreb, Karremans stated that there were no "good guys and bad guys" in this conflict. He also praised the strategic qualities of Mladic. His statements got Dutch secretary of Defence Joris Voorhoeve into political trouble.

=== Promotion after returning to the Netherlands ===
Shortly after his return to The Netherlands Karremans was promoted to full colonel, which caused controversy.

=== Complaints through the justice system against Karremans ===
In 2010, Hasan Nuhanović, a survivor of the Srebrenica genocide, and the relatives of the murdered Muslim electrician Rizo Mustafić (who was employed by Dutchbat during the genocide until he was turned over to the Serbs and killed) made a legal complaint of genocide and war crimes against Karremans, his former deputy Major Rob Franken, and human resources manager Berend Oosterveen for their transfer of the Muslim families to the Serbs. The Public Prosecution Service first concluded in a Nolle prosequi decision that Karremans and the other persons were not culpable. Through a special procedure (Dutch art. 12 Wet strafvordering), this decision was brought to court. On 29 April 2015, the court in Arnhem confirmed that Karremans and his secondants should not be prosecuted. Directly after the ruling, the lawyer Liesbeth Zegveld announced an appeal at the European Court of Human Rights (ECHR). The ECHR declared the case inadmissible, on 30 August 2016, arguing that it "cannot find that there was any misrepresentation of facts or arguments by the Military Chamber of the Court of Appeal" in Arnhem.

== After army career ==
After retiring from the army, Karremans and his wife moved to Spain, partly because of death threats in his native Netherlands. He wrote of his experiences at Srebrenica in Een puzzel van de werkelijkheid (translated A puzzle of reality). He describes problems and dilemmas for him and his men during six months in Bosnia and six days of war. In the book, Karremans gives his view on the lack of support from the Dutch politicians at the time. He felt that he was forced by the Dutch politicians to fight with his hands behind his back.

== See also ==
- Dutchbat
