= Drina Corps =

Drina Coprs Дрински корпус
- Active: 1 November, 1992 — 1996
- Country: Republika Srpska
- Allegiance: Army of Republika Srpska
- Branch: Ground Forces
- Type: Motorized; Mountain; Armoured
- Role: The protection of the eastern parts of Republika Srpska
- Size: 18,000
- Garrison/HQ: Vlasenica
- Anniversaries: 1 November
- Engagements: Bosnian War: Siege of Srebrenica; Siege of Žepa; Siege of Goražde; Operation Cerska '93; Operation Star '94; Operation Krivaja '95; Operation Stupčanica '95; Operation Tekbir '95; Other operations

Commanders
- Commander: Milenko Živanović (1992-July 1995), Radislav Krstić (July 1995-1996)

Drina Corps (Serbian: Дрински корпус, Drinski korpus) was one of the six corps of the Army of Republika Srpska (VRS), established on 1 November 1992. Commander of the corps was Milenko Živanović until July 1995, when he was replaced by Radislav Krstić. The corps numbered 18,000 soldiers.

== Organization ==
The headquarters of the Drina Corps was in Vlasenica. Responsibility zone of the Drina Corps was determined by the River Drina, Kalesija, Kladanj, Olovo and River Prača, over 200 km² of front (February 1993). Drina Corps participated in operations Operation Cerska, Operation Drina, Operation Podrinje, Operation Krivaja '95, Operation Stupčanica '95 and more.

== Drina Corps Units ==
=== Brigades ===
- 1st Podrinje Light Infantry Brigade, HQ Rogatica
- 5th Podrinje Light Infantry Brigade, HQ Višegrad
- 1st Zvornik Infantry Brigade, HQ Zvornik-Karakaj
- 1st Birač Infantry Brigade, HQ Šekovići
- 1st Bratunac Light Infantry Brigade, HQ Bratunac
- 1st Vlasenica Light Infantry Brigade, HQ Vlasenica
- 1st Milići Light Infantry Brigade, HQ Milići
- 2nd Romanija Motorized Brigade, HQ Sokolac
- Independent Infantry Battalion “Skelani”, HQ Skelani

=== Other units ===
- 5th Military Police Battalion, HQ Vlasenica
- 5th Communications Battalion, HQ Vlasenica
- 5th Mixed Artillery Regiment, HQ Vlasenica
- 5th Engineer Battalion, HQ Vlasenica
- 5th Medical Battalion, HQ Vlasenica
- Special Brigade "Garda Panteri" (from May 2, 1992 to September 4, 1992), HQ Bijeljina
- Special Police Unit "Wolves of the Drina", HQ Zvornik-Karakaj
- Special Unit "Mando", HQ Vlasenica
- Greek Volunteer Guard, HQ Vlasenica

== Books ==
- Bulatović, Ljiljana (2010). Raport Komandantu. Beograd: Udruženje pisaca Poeta. ISBN 978-86-86863-32-4.
- Pandurević, Vinko (2012). Serbs in Bosnia and Herzegovina: from the declaration to the constitution: political, defense and military organization of the Serbian people in Bosnia and Herzegovina 1991-1995 (in Serbian). Belgrade: IGAM. ISBN 978-86-83927-69-2.
