= United Nations Security Council Resolution 836 =

1993 Bosnia and Herzegovina resolution

UN Security Council Resolution 836
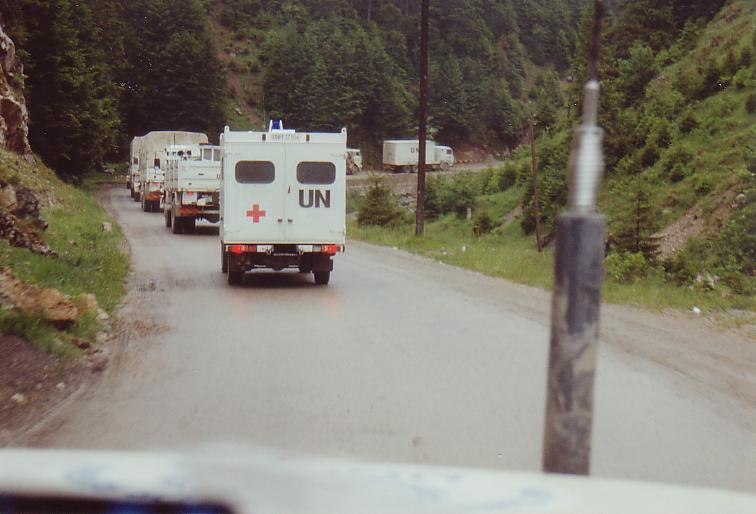
- United Nations humanitarian convoy (1994)
- Date: 4 June 1993
- Meeting no.: 3,228
- Code: S/RES/836 (Document)
- Subject: Bosnia and Herzegovina
- Voting summary: 13 voted for; None voted against; 2 abstained
- Result: Adopted

Security Council composition
- Permanent members: China; France; Russia; United Kingdom; United States
- Non-permanent members: Brazil; Cape Verde; Djibouti; Hungary; Japan; Morocco; New Zealand; Pakistan; Spain; Venezuela

United Nations Security Council resolution 836 was adopted on 4 June 1993. After reaffirming Resolution 713 (1991) and all subsequent resolutions on the situation in the former Yugoslavia, the Council expressed its alarm at the continuing situation in Bosnia and Herzegovina and decided to expand the mandate of the United Nations Protection Force (UNPROFOR) by allowing it to use force to protect the "safe areas".

The council reaffirmed Resolution 819 (1993) which demanded that a number of cities in Bosnia and Herzegovina be treated as safe areas and also affirmed the sovereignty, territorial integrity and independence of the country, condemning all military attacks and actions against it. The council also expressed its alarm about serious violations of international humanitarian law including the acquisition of territory by force or by ethnic cleansing.

The resolution also reaffirmed the ban on military flights imposed in resolutions 781 (1992), 786 (1992) and 816 (1993) over Bosnia and Herzegovina and asserted that the concept of the "safe areas" was in response to an emergency and would contribute to a lasting political solution, but not be an end in itself. It also stressed a lasting solution would require the end of hostilities, withdrawal from territories seized by force or by ethnic cleansing, the right of refugees to return to their homes, and respect for the territory of Bosnia and Herzegovina.

Acting under Chapter VII of the United Nations Charter, the Council called for the full implementation of all its previous resolutions and decided the expand the mandate of UNPROFOR to enable it to deter attacks against the safe areas, to monitor the ceasefire, to promote the withdrawal of military or paramilitary units other than those of the Government of Bosnia and Herzegovina and to occupy some key points on the ground in addition to providing humanitarian aid provided for in Resolution 776 (1992). The safe areas imposed were temporary measures with the aim of reversing the consequences of violence and allowing displaced persons to return home.

Addressing the Secretary-General Boutros Boutros-Ghali, the Council asked him to make adjustments or to reinforce UNPROFOR to implement the present resolution and to direct the UNPROFOR Force Commander to redeploy troops in Bosnia and Herzegovina, urging Member States to contribute to the peacekeeping force both in terms of personnel and logistics. UNPROFOR was then authorised to take measures, including the use of force, in response to bombing, raids or the interference of UNPROFOR or humanitarian convoys in the safe areas.

The council also authorised states to use all necessary measures, through air power, to support UNPROFOR around the safe areas. The Secretary-General was requested within 7 days to report on how the current resolution would be implemented and the costs involved. Within 2 months, Boutros-Ghali had to report on the implementation and enforcement of this resolution. Finally, the council stressed the possibility of imposing new and tougher measures if necessary.

Resolution 836 was adopted by 13 votes to none, with two abstentions from Pakistan and Venezuela.

== See also ==
- Bosnian Genocide
- Bosnian War
- Breakup of Yugoslavia
- Croatian War of Independence
- List of United Nations Security Council Resolutions 801 to 900 (1993–1994)
- Yugoslav Wars
