= Christ Klep =

Dutch military historian (born 1959)

Christ P. M. Klep (born 1959) is a Dutch military historian. He is a lecturer at Utrecht University and freelance historian and publicist. He has appeared amongst others on Pauw & Witteman, NPO Radio 1 and Knevel & Van de Brink, and has written for de Volkskrant, Trouw and De Groene Amsterdammer - commenting on topics as the Joint Strike Fighter program, the Russian military intervention in Ukraine and the recruiting practices of the Armed forces of the Netherlands.

== Education and career ==
Klep studied to become a teacher of English and history between 1982 and 1986. He subsequently went to Utrecht University, specializing in Eastern-European studies, Russian studies, contemporary history and international relations between 1986 and 1988. Afterwards he became a lecturer of history at same University, where he worked until 1992.

Klep worked for the Dutch Institute for Military History of the Dutch Ministry of Defence from 1992 to 2000. From 2000 to 2001 he worked for the Institute of Dutch History. Later he became a freelance historian and publicist. In 2006 he worked a semester as lecturer at University College Roosevelt.

In 2006 Klep returned to Utrecht University, where he was a lecturer and researcher until 2010. He earned his doctorate on a study of three peace keeping missions in Somalia, Rwanda and Srebrenica.

He currently is a lecturer at Utrecht University.

== Claims of Dutchbat leadership having knowledge of an impending massacre at Srebrenica ==
In 2011 he disputed Thom Karremans account about not knowing about the impending genocide at Srebrenica (in 1995); Klep interviewed dozens of Karremans former troops [in Dutchbat III battalion].

== Publications ==
- Somalië, Rwanda, Srebrenica. De nasleep van drie ontspoorde vredesmissies (Amsterdam, 2008)
- Uruzgan. Nederlandse militairen op missie, 2005–2010 (Amsterdam, 2011)
