= Operation Krivaja '95 =

Military operation in 1995

- Part of the Bosnian War
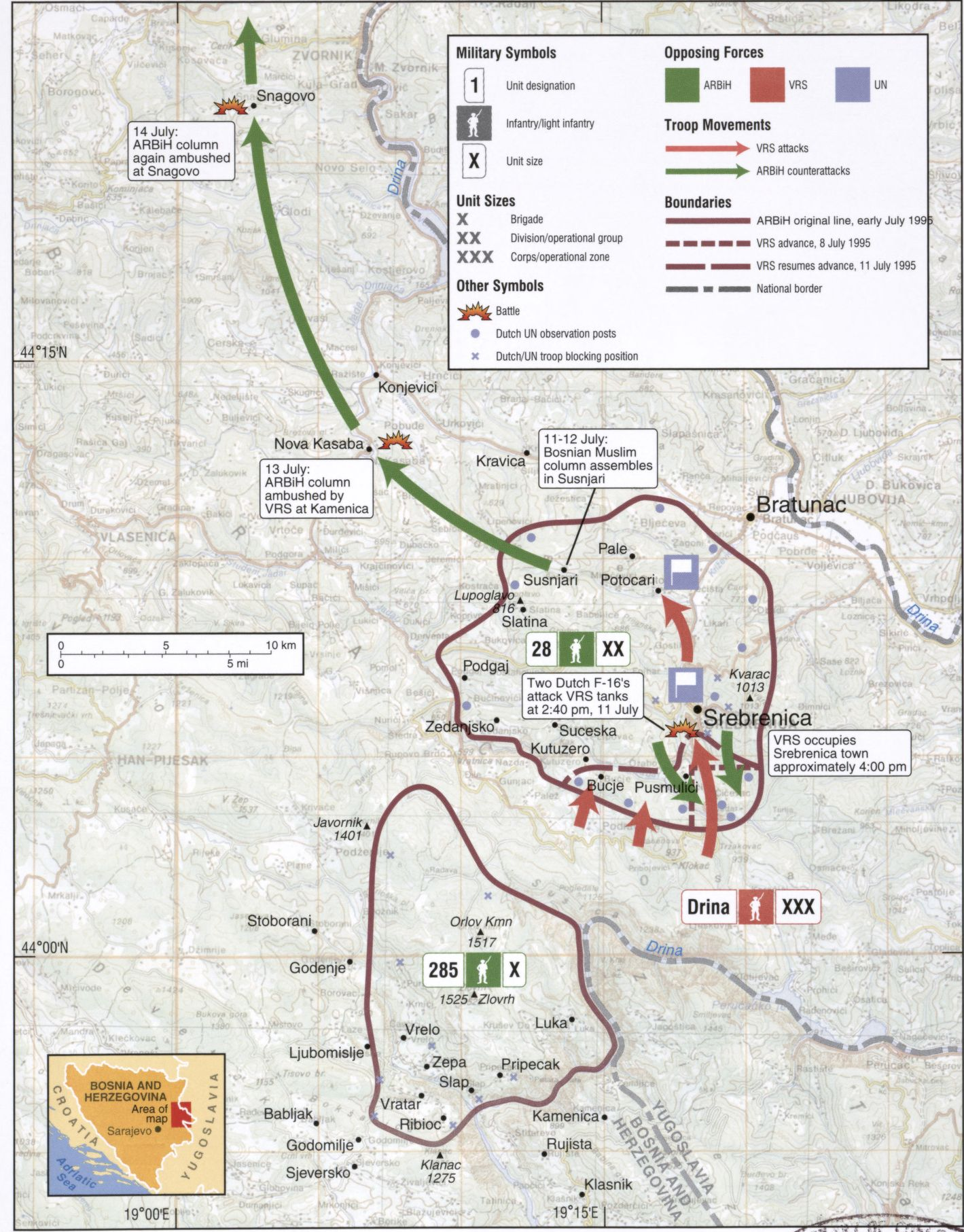
- A map depicting the capture of Srebrenica by Bosnian Serb forces
Date	6–11 July 1995
Location	Srebrenica, Bosnia and Herzegovina
Result	Army of Republika Srpska victory

Belligerents
Army of Republika Srpska; Greek Volunteer Guard; Russian Volunteers; Scorpions; Ukrainian Volunteers	Army of the Republic of Bosnia and Herzegovina; NATO; (United Nations) UNPROFOR; (Netherlands) Dutchbat; (Ukraine) Ukrainian peacekeepers

Commanders and leaders
(Republika Srpska) Ratko Mladić (Republika Srpska) Radislav Krstić (Republika Srpska) Zdravko Tolimir (Republika Srpska) Milenko Živanović (Republika Srpska) Milorad Pelemiš	(Bosnia and Herzegovina) Ramiz Bećirović (WIA) (United Nations) Thomas Karremans

Strength
2,000 soldiers 200–300 volunteers 200 volunteers (Greece) 100 volunteers (Ukraine) 7 volunteers	6,000 soldiers (NATO) Air Support (United Nations) 270 peacekeepers

Casualties and losses
300 soldiers killed	750 soldiers killed (United Nations) 1 peacekeeper killed (United Nations) Hundreds of peacekeepers taken hostage

Operation Krivaja '95 (Serbian: Oпeрaциja Криваја '95, Bosnian: Operacija Krivaja '95) was the codename of a military operation launched by the Army of Republika Srpska (VRS) against formations of the Army of the Republic of Bosnia and Herzegovina (ARBiH) in the UN enclave of Srebrenica. It was launched on 6 July 1995, and ended on 11 July 1995 with VRS capture of the city. The operation ended the three-year-long siege of the town and was followed by the Srebrenica massacre and Operation Stupčanica '95, which has been ruled a crime of genocide by international courts of law.

== Course of the operation ==
In late-June 1995, Ratko Mladić made the decision to launch an attack on Srebrenica, which evidence indicates had always been part of his long-term strategy. However, the Serbs did not expect Srebrenica to be an easy conquest. With 100 members of the Greek Volunteer Guard, together with 2,000–3,000 reinforcements and 200–300 members of the Serb Volunteer Guard, the Bosnian Serbs could hardly muster 4,000–5,000 men for the offensives against Srebrenica and Žepa. Of these, it was estimated that only 2,000 would take part in the thrust to capture Srebrenica in July 1995. The Bosniaks, not as well-armed as their opponents, had a military force of 6,000 men within the town, about one-third or one-half of whom were armed. 1,500 of these were professional soldiers and 1,500 were armed militiamen. Also in the town were the 570 lightly armed peacekeepers of the Dutch battalion (DUTCHBAT).

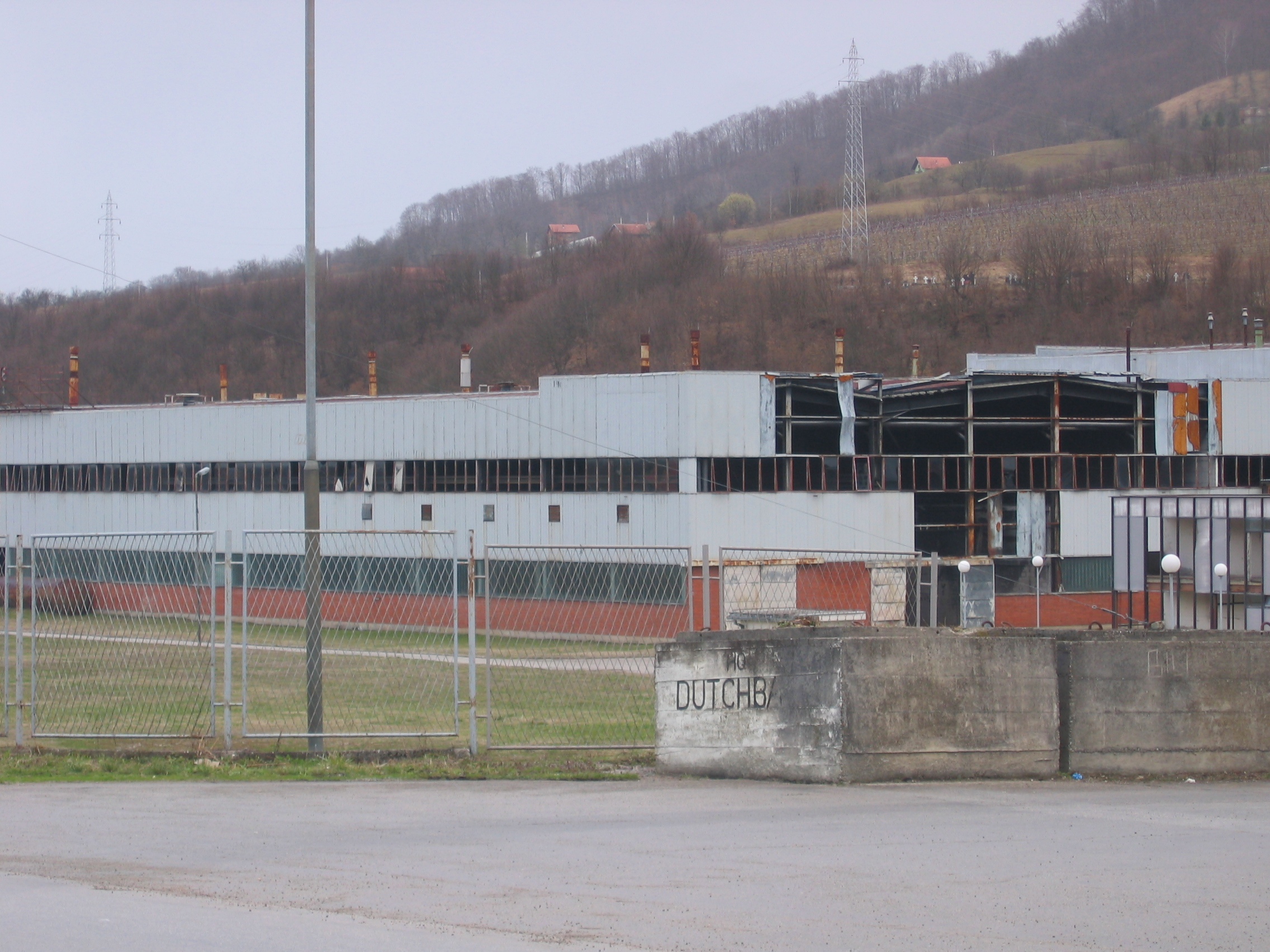
The compound that served as the headquarters of the Dutch Battalion in Potočari.

On 2 July, Major General Milenko Živanović, then commander of the Drina Corps of the VRS, signed two orders laying out the plans for an attack on the UN protected area at Srebrenica codenamed Krivaja '95. The objective of the operation was for the VRS to attack the enclave, and effectively eliminate it. Alongside police and paramilitary units from both the Republika Srpska and Yugoslavia, as well as Greek, Russian and Ukrainian volunteers, the VRS began attacking various points at the southern edge of the Srebrenica enclave on 6 July. The forces of the VRS, numbering 1,500 in the initial stages of the attack, then shelled a series of Dutch observation posts in the southern portion of the enclave, forcing the Dutch peacekeepers stationed there to flee. On the other hand, the few thousand remaining Bosniak soldiers of Srebrenica offered little resistance as their best-trained units had already abandoned the town. To make matters worse, Dutch peacekeepers had confiscated their weapons. When the Bosniaks demanded that their weapons be returned to them, the Dutch refused. As a result, Bosniak troops attempted to block the Dutch withdrawal in the face of the Bosnian Serb onslaught and more than 100 Dutch soldiers were taken hostage by the Bosniaks in a desperate attempt to stop them from leaving. Subsequently, a Dutch peacekeeper was killed after a hand grenade was thrown at his APC by a Bosniak soldier. The Dutch then demanded that NATO bomb Serb positions around the town, but their requests were ignored. With virtually no Bosniak resistance, the VRS relentlessly pounded Srebrenica with artillery on 9 and 10 July. On 11 July, the VRS entered the town. As it did, Mladić had about thirty Dutch soldiers taken hostage. About 3,000-4,000 Bosniak civilians then fled to the UN compound in Potočari where all men between fourteen and seventy were segregated by the VRS, the great bulk of which were trucked to neighboring Serb-held Bratunac. DutchBat personnel who attempted to follow them were seized by the VRS, together with their UN vehicles and some uniforms, weapons and other equipment. Whereas Mladić had expected the ARBiH 28th Division to regroup near Potočari, the men of this division chose instead to flee to Bosnian-held territory. On 12 July the Serbs learned that the majority of the town's men had indeed fled the enclave, with 700–900 fleeing east to Serbia, 300–850 fleeing south to Žepa, and 10,000–15,000 fleeing north to Tuzla. Of these 10,000–15,000, approximately 6,000 were fleeing Bosniak soldiers, of whom 1,000–1,500 were armed. By the time the VRS had been redeployed, about 3,000 soldiers of the column's better-armed vanguard had successfully escaped to Tuzla. The 9,000–12,000 Bosniaks who remained were encircled by VRS units and attacked by artillery, armor and small arms fire. The relatively few who survived the experience recounted how many panic-stricken Bosniak men committed suicide, killed each other in the dark, or drowned while attempting to cross the Jadar river, but by far the greatest portion of the men surrendered, some unwittingly to VRS soldiers equipped with stolen UN vehicles, helmets and uniforms.

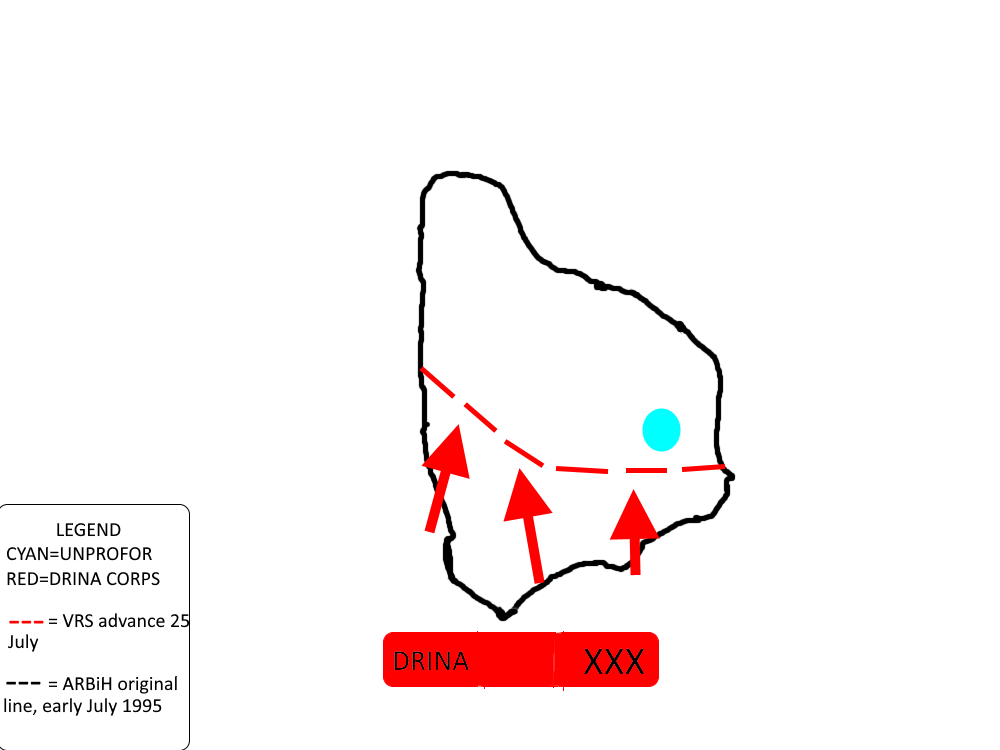
Map of Operation Stupčanica 95

At midday on 11 July, Dutch NATO planes arrived from Italy and struck a Bosnian Serb tank, before being forced to cease operations after General Mladić threatened to "destroy" both the Dutch soldiers and the Bosniak population of Srebrenica unless airstrikes were called off. That afternoon, Mladić, accompanied by General Živanović (then Commander of the Drina Corps), General Krstić (then Deputy Commander and Chief of Staff of the Drina Corps) and other Bosnian Serb officers, took a triumphant walk through the deserted streets of the town of Srebrenica. The moment was captured on film by Serbian journalist Zoran Petrović Piroćanac. Mladić posed for television cameras, before declaring that Srebrenica had been "returned forever to the Serbs." Later, Thom Karremans, the commander of the Dutch troops in the town, drank a toast with Mladić which was filmed for Serb television. Off-camera, however, Mladić warned Karremans that the UN compound in Potočari, where thousands of Bosniak refugees had gathered, would be shelled by the VRS if NATO planes reappeared.

== Aftermath ==
=== Srebrenica massacre ===
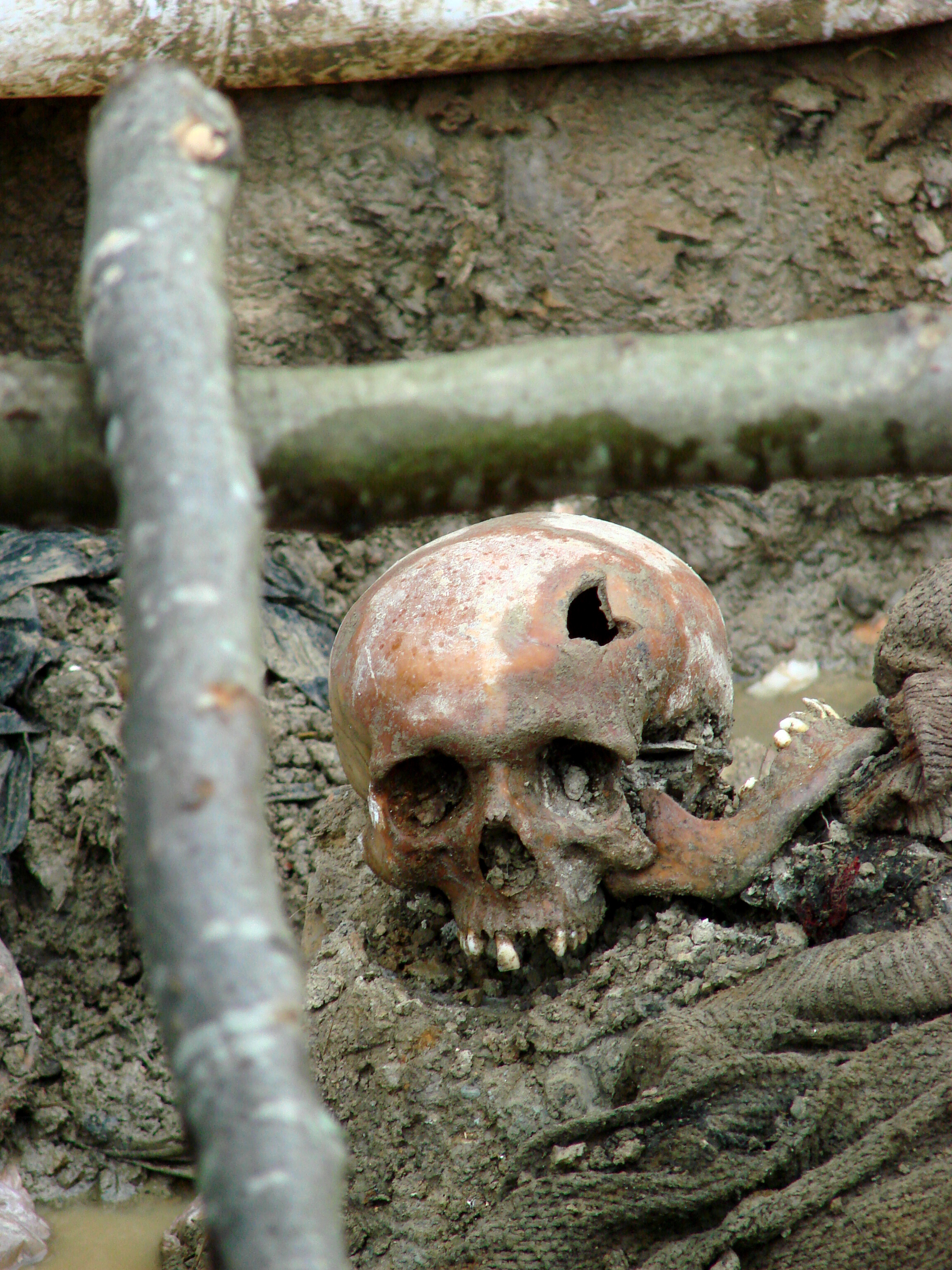
Skull of a victim of the July 1995 Srebrenica massacre. Exhumed mass grave outside the village of Potocari, Bosnia and Herzegovina. July 2007.

On 12 July, buses began arriving to take Bosniak women and children to Bosniak-held territory while Dutch troops helped Bosnian Serb forces in separating all men from the ages of 15 to 65. Some of the men were killed or beaten on the spot, while women were raped. The fall of the town was followed by a massacre of prisoners taken by the VRS forces and civilian refugees who had been handed over to the VRS by Dutchbat troops after they had sought shelter on the Dutchbat base at Potočari. The ICTY Trial Chamber was satisfied that the total number executed was likely to have been within the range of 7,000 to 8,000. The bodies were disposed of in unmarked mass graves which were subsequently reopened and the contents mingled and relocated. The killings and their concealment, carried out in an organised and systematic manner, were subsequently confirmed by the ICTY to have been a crime of genocide pursuant to the United Nations Convention on the Prevention and Punishment of the Crime of Genocide. For example, on 14 July 1995, prisoners from Bratunac were bussed northward to a school in the village of Pilica, north of Zvornik. As at other detention facilities, there was no food or water and several men died in the school gym from heat and dehydration. The men were held at the Pilica school for two nights. On 16 July 1995, following a now familiar pattern, the men were called out of the school and loaded onto buses with their hands tied behind their backs. They were then driven to the Branjevo Military Farm, where groups of 10 were lined up and shot systematically. One of the survivors recalled:

When they opened fire, I threw myself on the ground ... And one man fell on my head. I think that he was killed on the spot. And I could feel the hot blood pouring over me ... I could hear one man crying for help. He was begging them to kill him. And they simply said "Let him suffer. We'll kill him later."

— Witness Q

Dražen Erdemović – who confessed to killing at least 70 Bosniaks – was a member of the VRS 10th Sabotage Detachment (a Main Staff subordinate unit) and participated in the mass execution. Erdemović appeared as a prosecution witness and testified: "The men in front of us were ordered to turn their backs. When those men turned their backs to us, we shot at them. We were given orders to shoot." Erdemović said that all but one of the victims wore civilian clothes and that, except for one person who tried to escape, they offered no resistance before being shot. Sometimes the executioners were particularly cruel. When some of the soldiers recognised acquaintances from Srebrenica, they beat and humiliated them before killing them. Erdemović had to persuade his fellow soldiers to stop using a machine gun for the killings; while it mortally wounded the prisoners it did not cause death immediately and prolonged their suffering. Between 1,000 and 1,200 men were killed in the course of that day at this execution site. Aerial photographs, taken on 17 July 1995, of an area around the Branjevo Military Farm, show a large number of bodies lying in the field near the farm, as well as traces of the excavator that collected the bodies from the field. Erdemović testified that, at around 15:00 hours on 16 July 1995, after he and his fellow soldiers from the 10th Sabotage Detachment had finished executing the prisoners at the Branjevo Military Farm, they were told that there was a group of 500 Bosniak prisoners from Srebrenica trying to break out of a nearby Dom Kultura club. Erdemović and the other members of his unit refused to carry out any more killings. They were then told to attend a meeting with a Lieutenant Colonel at a café in Pilica. Erdemović and his fellow-soldiers travelled to the café as requested and, as they waited, they could hear shots and grenades being detonated. The sounds lasted for approximately 15–20 minutes after which a soldier from Bratunac entered the café to inform those present that "everything was over". There were no survivors to explain exactly what had happened in the Dom Kultura. Over a year later, it was still possible to find physical evidence of this atrocity. As in Kravica, many traces of blood, hair and body tissue were found in the building, with cartridges and shells littered throughout the two storeys. It could also be established that explosives and machine guns had been used. Human remains and personal possessions were found under the stage, where blood had dripped down through the floorboards. Čančari Road 12 was the site of the re-interment of at least 174 bodies, moved here from the mass grave at the Branjevo Military Farm. Only 43 were complete sets of remains, most of which established that death had taken place as there result of rifle fire. Of the 313 various body parts found, 145 displayed gunshot wounds of a severity likely to prove fatal.
