= Siege of Žepa =

1992 – 1995 siege during the Bosnian War

- Part of the Bosnian War
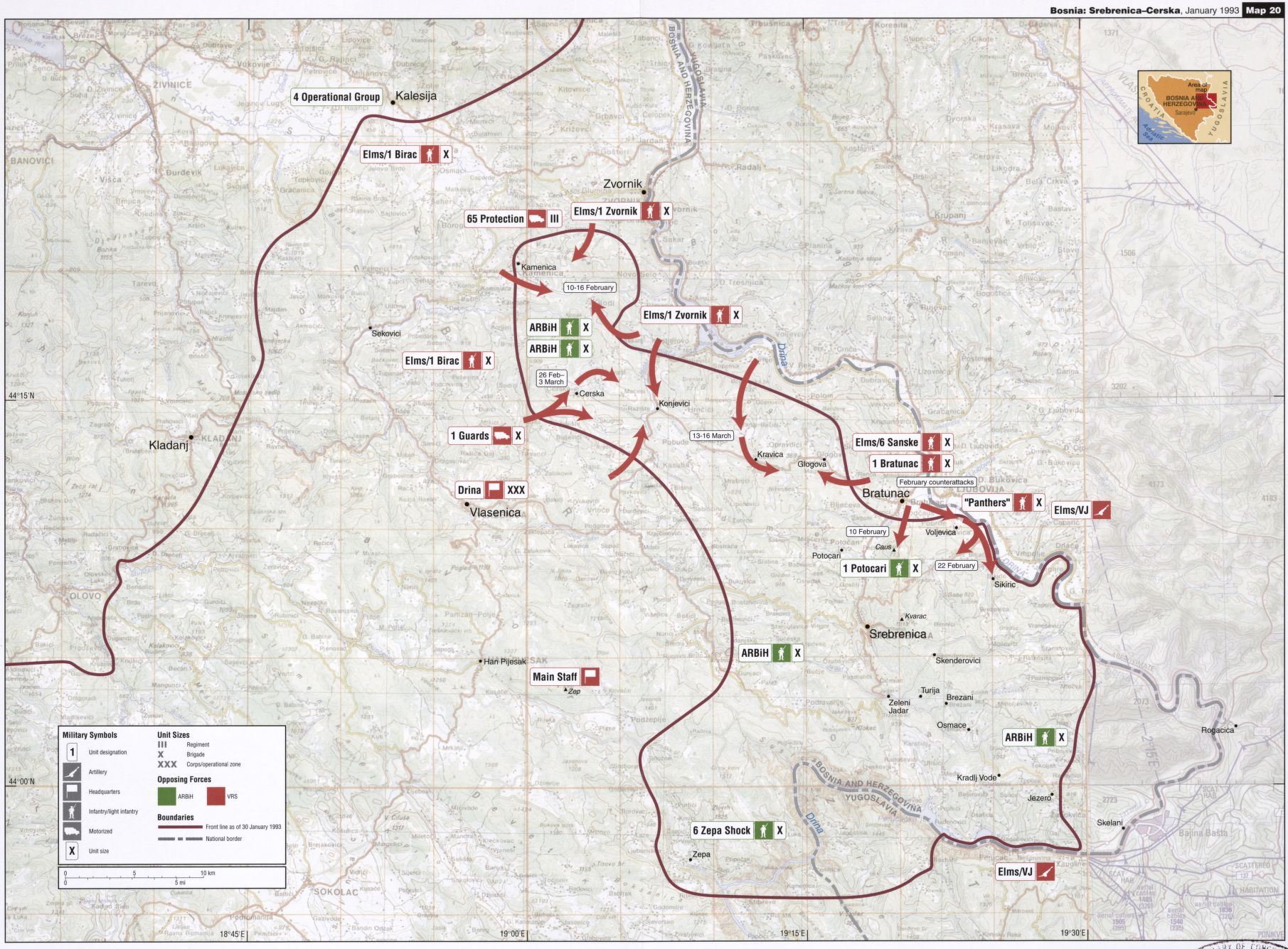
- Eastern Bosnia battleground in January 1993.
Date	Summer 1992 (Note: The exact date of when the siege began is unknown)– 26 July 1995
Location	Žepa, Bosnia and Herzegovina 43°57′N 19°07′E
Result	Army of Republika Srpska victory
Territorial changes	Republika Srpska captures the Žepa enclave

Belligerents
Republika Srpska	Bosnia and Herzegovina; UNPROFOR (1995); NATO (1995)

Commanders and leaders
(Republika Srpska) Ratko Mladić (Republika Srpska) Zdravko Tolimir (Republika Srpska) Radislav Krstić (Republika Srpska) Željko Ražnatović	(Bosnia and Herzegovina) Mustafa Palić (surrendered) (Bosnia and Herzegovina) Hamdija Torlak (surrendered) (Bosnia and Herzegovina) Mehmed Hajrić (executed) (Bosnia and Herzegovina) Avdo Palić (executed) (Bosnia and Herzegovina) Amir Imamović (executed)

Units involved
Yugoslav People's Army (1992); Army of Republika Srpska; 1st Guards Brigade; 65th Protection Motorized Regiment; Garda Panteri; 3rd Military Police Battalion; Special Police Unit "Drina Wolves"; 10th Sabotage Detachment; Serb Volunteer Guard	Army of the Republic of Bosnia and Herzegovina; 2nd Corps; 28th Podrinje Independent Division; 285th Light Mountain Brigade; UNPROFOR; 240th Separate Battalion; 2nd Special Company

Strength
2,500 soldiers	1,500 soldiers 79 Ukrainian peacekeepers NATO Air Support

Casualties and losses
Unknown	Unknown
- 800 recorded deaths in the Žepa municipality

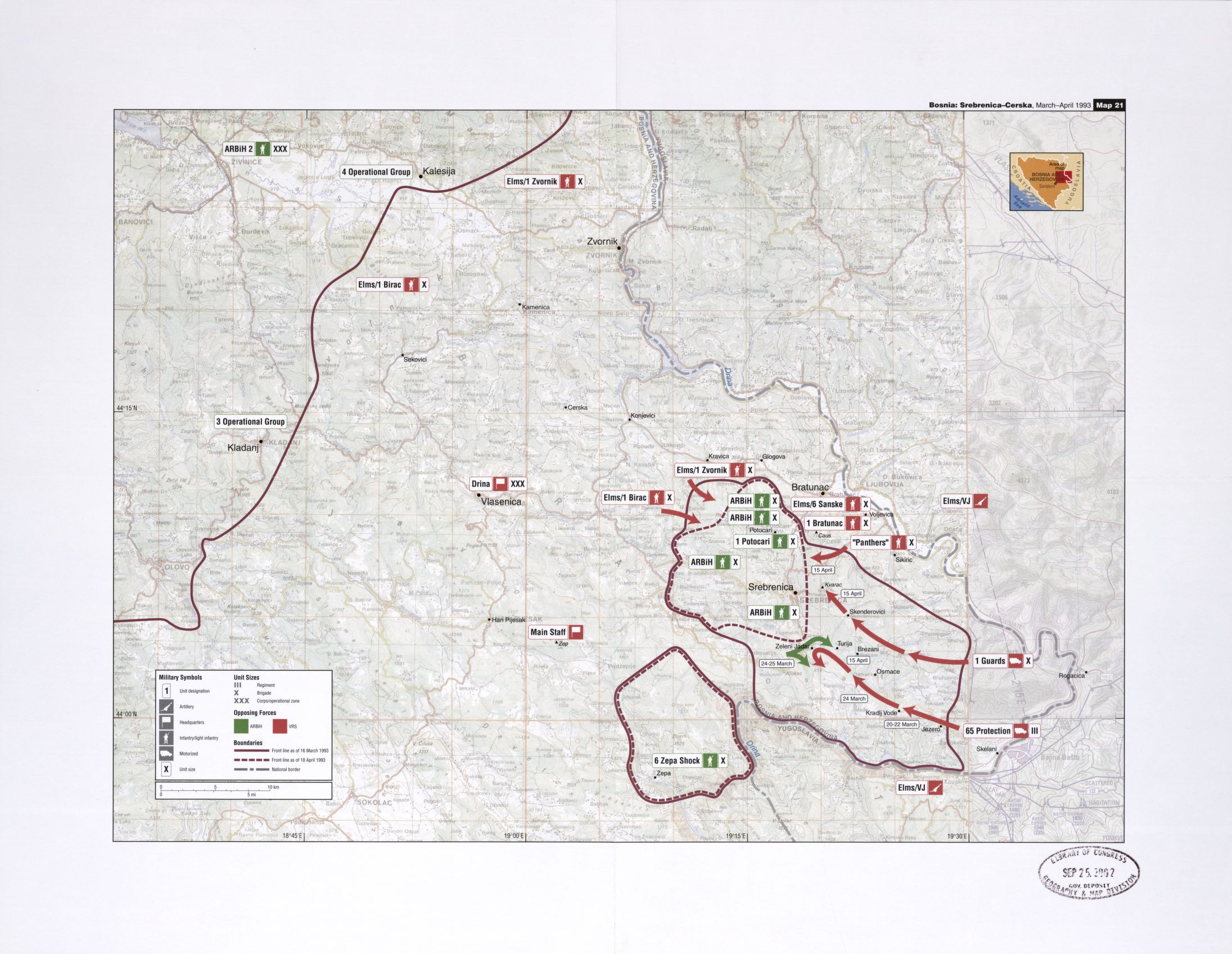
Eastern Bosnia battleground in April–March 1993.

The Siege of Žepa (Serbo-Croatian: Опсада Жепe, Opsada Žepe) was a three-year-long siege of the small Bosnian town of Žepa which had lasted from the summer of 1992 – July 1995 during the Bosnian War. It was initially besieged by the Yugoslav People's Army (JNA) and then by the Army of Republika Srpska (VRS). Throughout the siege, Žepa was part of the Srebrenica–Žepa link in eastern Bosnia. From April 1992 – February 1993, the Army of the Republic of Bosnia and Herzegovina (ARBiH) and the civilians of Žepa resisted the Bosnian Serb army using guerrilla warfare tactics.

However, in March 1993, VRS general Ratko Mladić ordered the Bosnian Serb forces besieging the town to launch a large-scale counterattack. The attack resulted in the Bosnian Serbs capturing 80 percent of the territory of the Srebrenica enclave once held by the 28th Division of the ARBiH. Due to this attack, Žepa was now separated from Srebrenica and was now a complete enclave of its own. On 16 April 1993, the United Nations Security Council Resolution 819 the Srebrenica enclave was declared a "UN safe haven". On 6 May 1993, the United Nations Security Council Resolution 824 made Žepa and other cities a "UN safe haven" under the protection of only 79 Ukrainian peacekeepers.

On the 25 July 1995, the Bosnian Serbs, under command of general Ratko Mladić and Zdravko Tolimir, launched an offensive against the 285th Light Mountain Brigade, commanded by Avdo Palić, 14 days after the fall of Srebrenica. The offensive was called "Operation Stupčanica 95" (Serbo-Croatian: Операција Ступчаницa 95, Operacija Stupčanica 95). It resulted in 800 refugees and the deaths of 116 in the takeover. Unlike in Srebrenica, the commander of the peacekeeping unit, Ukrainian officer Mykola Verkhohlyad in negotiations with general Mladić secured evacuation of civilians from Žepa in UN convoy. Verkhohlyad did not allow them to be taken over by Mladić's forces, which helped save over 10,000 Bosniak civilians.

NATO bombing operations continued targeting Bosnian Serb positions due to constant attacks on Sarajevo and the fall of the "UN safe havens" of Srebrenica and Žepa. The bombing operations wouldn't end until 20 September 1995 and would help the start the foundation of the Dayton Agreement.

== Background ==
Žepa is a small town in eastern Bosnia about 13 miles south of Srebrenica with 113 people. According to a 1991 census, 462 people lived in the village, of whom 450 (97.4%) were Bosniaks and 12 (2.6%) were from other ethnic groups. It shows that more Muslims lived there than any other group or people.

On 18 November 1990, the first multi-party parliamentary elections were held in Bosnia and Herzegovina (with a second round on 25 November). They resulted in a national assembly dominated by three ethnically based parties, which had formed a loose coalition to oust the communists from power. A significant split soon developed on the issue of whether to stay with the Yugoslav federation (overwhelmingly favoured among Serbs) or to seek independence (overwhelmingly favoured among Bosniaks and Croats).

The Serbs established the RAM Plan, developed by the State Security Administration (SDB or SDS) and a group of selected Serb officers of the Yugoslav People's Army (JNA) with the purpose of organizing Serbs outside Serbia, consolidating control of the fledgling SDP, and the prepositioning of arms and ammunition.

Alarmed, the government of Bosnia and Herzegovina declared independence from Yugoslavia on 15 October 1991, shortly followed by the establishment of the Serbian National Assembly by the Bosnian Serbs.

In January 1992, a Bosnian Serb state was declared, ahead of the 29 February - 1 March referendum on independence. Later renamed the Republika Srpska, it developed its own military as the JNA withdrew from Croatia and handed over its weapons, equipment and 55,000 troops to the newly created Bosnian Serb army. By 1 March, Bosnian Serb forces set up barricades in Sarajevo and elsewhere and later that month Bosnian Serb artillery began shelling the town of Bosanski Brod. By 4 April, Sarajevo began being shelled. In May 1992, the ground forces of Bosnian Serb state officially became known as the Army of Republika Srpska (Serbian: Војска Републике Српске, VRS). By the end of 1992, the VRS held seventy percent of Bosnia and Herzegovina.

The village Žepa was part of the much larger Rogatica municipality, though the wartime enclave itself held parts of the Srebrenica municipality. It was separated by the VRS and got attacked several times. In March 1993, the VRS launched numerous operations against the town. In March 1993, General Ratko Mladić of the VRS ordered the Bosnian Serb forces besieging the town to launch a large-scale counterattack. The attack resulted in the Bosnian Serbs capturing 80 percent of the territory of the Srebrenica enclave once held by the 28th Division of the Army of the Republic of Bosnia and Herzegovina (ARBiH). Žepa was then separated from the Srebrenica municipality.

== Operation Stupčanica 95 ==
Operation Stupčanica 95
- Part of the Bosnian War
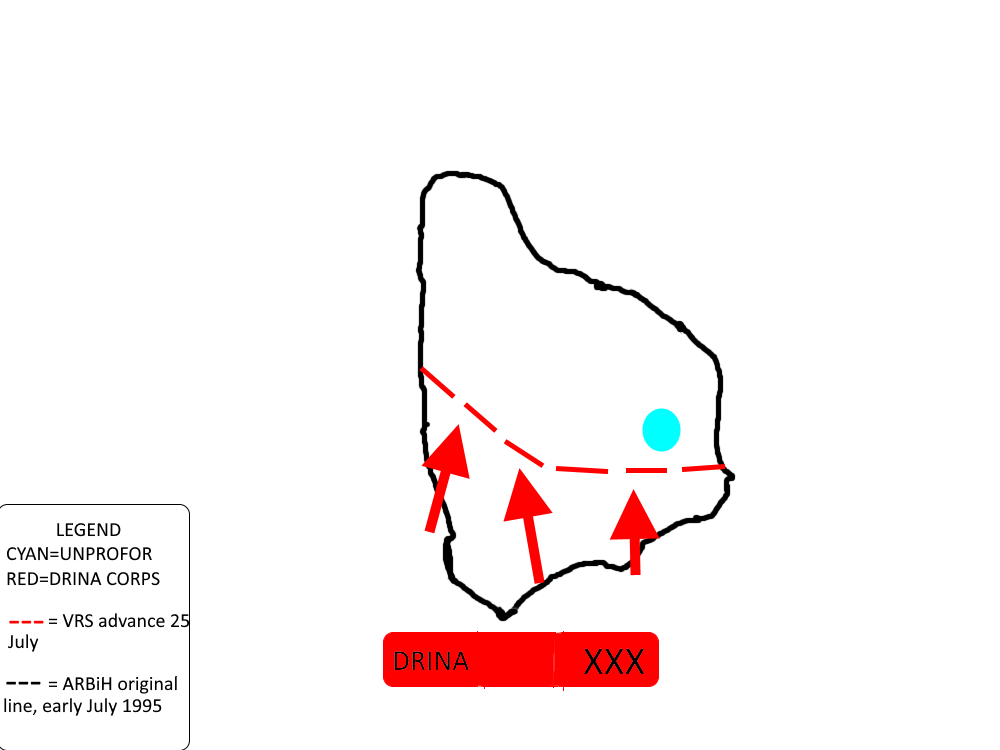
- A map of Stupčanica 95
Date	25 – 26 July 1995
Location	Žepa, Bosnia and Herzegovina
Result	Army of Republika Srpska victory
Territorial changes	Žepa enclave incorporated into the Republika Srpska

Belligerents
Republika Srpska	Republic of Bosnia and Herzegovina; UN (1995)

Commanders and leaders
(Republika Srpska) Ratko Mladić (Republika Srpska) Zdravko Tolimir	(Bosnia and Herzegovina) Avdo Palić (executed)

Units involved
Army of Republika Srpska; Drina Corps; Wolves of the Drina	ARBiH; 2nd Corps; 285th Light Mountain Brigade

Strength
Unknown	(Bosnia and Herzegovina) 500; 79 Ukrainian peacekeepers

Casualties and losses
Unknown	(Bosnia and Herzegovina) 116 killed in the takeover

Operation Stupčanica 95 (Serbo-Croatian: Операција Ступчаницa 95, Operacija Stupčanica 95) was the codename for the military offensive launched by the "Drina Corps" of the VRS against the 285th Light Mountain Brigade (2nd Corps). Launched on the 25 July 1995, it took 19 days for the VRS to capture Žepa. The offensive ended the three-year long siege of the town and what followed was the deaths of 116 people, 800 refugees, and the incorporation of Žepa into Republika Srpska. The offensive was launched 14 days after the fall of Srebrenica.

=== Prelude ===
Instead of raising all available brigades and starting a breakthrough towards Žepa or in an attack on the other side of the occupied territory of RBiH, Rasim Delić, after seeing the letter of Rama Čardaković addressed to Dr. Heljić, again wrote a letter to President Izetbegović. Delic writes:

"Mr. President, in the attachment of the document I am sending you the message that the Chief of Staff of the 285th IB.lbr sent to Mr. Bećir Heljić, noting that such actions have a very negative effect on the leadership and command system and, in practice so far, have a very negative effect on the development of the situation on the ground ... We ask that you, in your own judgment, react to such phenomena!"

On the 16 July 1995 at 10:05 p.m., realising that the 2nd Corps was not moving to help Žepa, Bećir Heljić and Avdo Palić wrote to Ramo Čardaković urgently requesting that attacks on the pocket be halted, exchanges of territory with the VRS and safe evacuation of the civilian population and members of the army.

On 10:25 p.m., July 17, 1995, the President of the municipality Mehmed Hajric wrote to President Alija Izetbegović demanding action. At 3 p.m. on 18 July 1995, President Izetbegović sent a letter to the head of his cabinet, Bakir Sadović, which was the reply of Hajrić in Žepa. It acknowledged the message was received and that negotiations with the VRS were ongoing, assuring help would arrive. At 3:57 p.m., not even an hour later, Hajric replied to President Izetbegović stating:

"If The Military And The MTS Do Not Help Us By 6:00 AM Tomorrow Morning, We Demand The Following: 1. Exchange The Territory To The Extent Possible With The Safe Extraction Of The Population; 2. If That Is Not Possible, Then You Must Provide A Safe Exit For The Population And Army Members (6500 Total); 3. In Any Case, The Population And Members Of The Army Must Leave The Pocket Safely, Regardless Of All Interests Of Wider Significance, Because We Know The Fate Of All The Escapeers Of Srebrenica; 4. The Situation On The Field Is All Critical And We Expect An Answer By 12.00 Tomorrow. If We Don't Get An Answer, We Will Consider That We Are At The Mercy Of The Aggressor!"

After receiving the alarming and accusatory letter from the civil and military authorities from Žepa, President Izetbegović asked Delic to make a plan for him on what, in fact, can be done for Žepa on the military front, and to give him the answer immediately! After less than an hour, Delic answered:

"I have considered your letter in detail, and based on a detailed review and knowledge of the situation as a whole, I can inform you: 4th Muslim Light Brigade is currently engaged in Treskavici...240. and the 242nd brigade have been engaged in fighting with the Chetniks for several days to create a corridor and receive forces from Srebrenica...243. The Muslim Podrinje brigade and its larger part is not in a condition – it does not want to go into offensive combat operations towards the Drina... The Black Wolves were decimated in the battle at Majevica... The Živinica wasps were engaged in several days of combat operations to receive the forces from Srebrenica... The Black Swans, that is a small tactical unit that cannot do anything important…”

On 21 July 1995, Tolimir sent a report to General Radomir Miletić, acting Chief of General Staff of the Bosnian Serb Army (VRS), requesting help to crush some Bosnian military strongholds and expressing his view that "the best way to do it would be to use chemical weapons". In the same report, Tolimir went even further, proposing chemical strikes against refugee columns of women, children and elderly leaving Žepa, because that would "force the Muslim fighters to surrender quickly", in his opinion.

=== Evacuation of civilians ===
On 22 July 1995 the commander of the Ukrainian peacekeeping unit Mykola Verkhohlyad was given order to secure evacuation of civilians from Žepa. Realizing the threat from Serbian forces who openly declared that any males aged 17 to 65 years would be "detained as prisoners of war". Verkhohlyad negotiated with Mladić and Palić and ultimately secured a deal on the evacuation being guarded by peacekeepers, with Ukrainian soldier present in every bus with civilians leaving the town. This prevented the trick used by Serbs in Srebrenica, where Dutch forces were present on the beginning and the end of the many kilometers long convoy, while the buses with civilians in the middle were quietly redirected to the execution place. As a result, over 10,000 civilians from Žepa were successfully evacuated which spared them the fate of victims of Srebrenica massacre.

=== Offensive ===
On the 25 July 1995, the offensive began. On the 26 July 1995, Mustafa Palic and Hamdija Torlak both surrendered and agreed to hand over Žepa. All other commanders, such as Avdo Palić, knowing that his men were outnumbered, outgunned and low on ammunition also sought to negotiate a withdrawal and spare the 30,000 people in Žepa the fate of the massacre victims in Srebrenica. He then got orders from Sarajevo not to surrender. On 27 July 1995, Palić went to a meeting with senior Serb and UN officials, among whom was General Ratko Mladić, the chief commander of the Bosnian Serb army. At the meeting he was seized by the Serbs. 800 refugees, mostly women, children, and the elderly, fled Žepa to Sarajevo. Mehmed Hajric, Amir Imamovic, and Avdo Palić were all killed after the offensive.

== International intervention ==
=== Continuation of NATO bombings ===
After the fall of the UN "safe havens" of Srebrenica and Žepa and constant attacks on Sarajevo, NATO launched a sustained air campaign known as Operation Deliberate Force, which targeted Bosnian Serb positions. The shelling of the Sarajevo marketplace on 28 August 1995 by the Bosnian Serb forces is considered to be the immediate factor behind NATO's decision to launch the operation. The campaign wouldn't end until 20 September 1995 and helped lift the siege of Sarajevo and lead the foundation for the Dayton Agreement.

=== Role of the UN ===
On 16 April 1993, the United Nations Security Council Resolution 819 declared the Srebrenica enclave a safe area. On 6 May 1993, the United Nations Security Council Resolution 824 further included Žepa and other cities as part of more safe areas. These cities and territories were placed under the protection of the UN peacekeeping units UNPROFOR. However, when Operation Stupčanica 95 began, they only sent around 79 Ukrainian peacekeepers to Žepa.

== Aftermath ==
=== Death of Avdo Palić ===
After the siege ended, Avdo Palić went to a meeting with senior Serb and UN officials, among whom was General Ratko Mladić, the chief commander of the Bosnian Serb army. He was last seen alive in a prison in Bijeljina in September 1995, in which two Bosniak prisoners from Srebrenica, Abdurahman Malkić and Sado Ramić, confirmed that they were held at the same prison as Palić in Bijeljina until late August 1995. However, the two men were transferred to another prison and eventually released after the signing of the Dayton Accords. The Republika Srpska government has concluded that on 5 September 1995 a VRS military officer came to the prison in Bijeljina and took Palić with him, after which he was never seen again.

Palić's fate remained a mystery for 14 years. The remains of Palić and eight other men were found in a mass grave near the village of Vragolovi in the municipality of Rogatica, near Žepa in November 2001. On 5 August 2009, it was announced that his remains had been found back in November 2001, but were not positively identified using DNA profiling until July 2009. On 26 August 2009, Palić was buried on the grounds of the Ali Pasha's Mosque in Sarajevo with several thousand people in attendance.

== Legacy ==
On 27 July 2016, the Day of remembrance of the killed people of Žepa was established. It commemorates the fallen fighters and civilians who defended Žepa against the Bosnian Serbs.

== Sources ==
- Acquaviva, Guido; Whiting, Alex; Cassese, Antonio; Fan, Mary (2011). International Criminal Law: Cases and Commentary. Oxford: Oxford University Press. ISBN 978-0-19-957678-4.
- "Prosecutor v. Naser Orić (Trial Judgment)" (PDF). International Criminal Tribunal for the former Yugoslavia. 30 June 2006. IT-03-68-T.
- Ingrao, Charles (2012). Confronting the Yugoslav Controversies: A Scholars' Initiative. West Lafayette, Indiana: Purdue University Press. ISBN 978-1-55753-617-4.
- Ramet, Sabrina P. (2006). The Three Yugoslavias: State-Building and Legitimation, 1918–2005. Bloomington: Indiana University Press. ISBN 978-0-253-34656-8.
