= Avdo Palić =

Bosnian military commander

- Born: 4 April 1958; Han Pijesak, Yugoslavia
- Died: 1995 (aged 37); Bosnia and Herzegovina
- Military career
- Allegiance: Bosnia and Herzegovina
- Service years: 1992–95
- Rank: Colonel
- Unit: ARBiH 285th Light Mountain Brigade
- Commands: Brigade commander in Žepa enclave
- Conflicts: Bosnian War; Siege of Žepa; Operation Stupčanica '95

Avdo Palić (4 April 1958 – 1995) was a Bosnian military officer during the Bosnian war. Palić held the rank of colonel in the Army of the Republic of Bosnia and Herzegovina (ARBiH) and commanded the Bosnian government forces in the enclave of Žepa during the entire 40-month-long siege.

On 27 July 1995, Palić disappeared after he went to a meeting with UNPROFOR and Army of Republika Srpska (VRS). He was last seen alive in a prison in Bijeljina in September 1995 after which his fate remained a mystery for 14 years. On 5 August 2009, it was announced that his remains had been found back in November 2001, but were not positively identified using DNA profiling until July 2009.

== Early life ==
Avdo Palić was born in the village of Krivača in the municipality of Han Pijesak in north-eastern Bosnia and Herzegovina, Socialist Federal Republic of Yugoslavia, into a Muslim Bosniak family. Prior to the war he served in the Yugoslav People's Army (JNA) as a reserve artillery officer and was a graduate of the Yugoslav Military Academy and the University of Sarajevo. During his studies in Sarajevo, he met his wife Esma from Žepa. Before the war, they lived in Vlasenica, where Avdo was employed as a teacher in the local high school.

== Bosnian War ==
During the war Avdo and Esma Palić married; the couple had two daughters. Esma came to Žepa, her hometown on 29 March 1992, to visit her relatives. Her future husband joined her shortly thereafter, when he came to visit his father in Vlasenica. When the war started in early April, Vlasenica fell to the Serb forces and Palić came to Žepa, where he became the commander of the local unit of the Territorial Defence Force of the Republic of Bosnia and Herzegovina and subsequently the commander of all Bosnian government forces in the area (which would eventually become known as the ARBiH 285th Light Mountain Brigade).

On 4 June 1992, a 40-vehicle convoy of Bosnian Serb troops was sent from Pale to occupy Žepa. As it passed through a canyon on the way to the town it was ambushed by Palić and his men. The defenders of Žepa were not adequately armed and equipped to stop the convoy so they also dislodged boulders and rolled logs down into the canyon in effort to stop the attack. Forty-five Bosnian Serb soldiers were killed and another 31 were captured. All of the captured Serb soldiers were later exchanged for food. Following that unsuccessful attempt to occupy Žepa the Serbs laid siege for the next three years.

The Žepa enclave was in a remote, mountainous and heavily forested area and was completely surrounded by the Republika Srpska rebel army which regularly and indiscriminately shelled the enclave. Žepa was entirely dependent on outside supplies of food and medicine which were supposed to be delivered by the Ukrainian UNPROFOR peacekeepers, but the deliveries were consistently obstructed by the Serbs. Nevertheless, the defenders of Žepa were able to hold out in spite of a severe lack of weapons and ammunition. Nearly all of their weapons were captured from the enemy or were smuggled in on foot or by helicopter from the Bosnian government controlled areas.

On 6 May 1993, the United Nations Security Council passed Resolution 824. The resolution declared six areas in Bosnia and Herzegovina including Žepa, as "safe areas" and declared that they "should be free from armed attacks and any other hostile act".

After the passage of the resolution the Žepa enclave was demilitarized and a contingent of UNPROFOR troops from Ukraine was stationed there. The ARBiH forces turned over most of their weapons to the UNPROFOR in exchange for UN guarantees to protect the enclave in the event of an attack. However the shelling as well as other offensive actions against Žepa continued.

In early 1995 the Serbs stepped up military operations against the eastern Bosnian enclaves of Srebrenica and Žepa. In March 1995 the President of Republika Srpska, Radovan Karadžić, issued a directive concerning the long-term strategy of the VRS forces in the region. The directive, known as Directive 7, specified that the Serb forces were to "complete the physical separation of Srebrenica from Žepa as soon as possible, preventing even communication between individuals in the two enclaves. By planned and well-thought out combat operations, create an unbearable situation of total insecurity with no hope of further survival or life for the inhabitants of Srebrenica". Between 6–11 July 1995 the Serbs overran the enclave of Srebrenica and committed the notorious Srebrenica massacre, summarily executing thousands of Bosnian prisoners of war and male civilians. Following that, they turned their sights on Žepa.

Knowing that his men were outnumbered, outgunned and low on ammunition, Col. Palić sought to negotiate a withdrawal and spare the 9,000 people in Žepa the fate of the massacre victims in Srebrenica. He first escorted his family to safety and returned to Žepa to secure safe passage for everybody else. While he negotiated his men hid in the forests around Žepa and began to make their way to areas such as Tuzla, Goražde and other Bosnian government controlled areas; many civilians also escaped. By engaging in negotiation he was able to give the people of Žepa time to escape and another massacre was avoided. During his meetings with Serb officers he was supposedly under the protection of the UN.

== Death ==
On 27 July 1995, Palić went to a meeting with senior Serb and UN officials, among whom was General Ratko Mladić, the chief commander of the Bosnian Serb army. At the meeting he was seized by the Serbs. Abdurahman Malkić and Sado Ramić, two Bosniak prisoners from Srebrenica confirmed that they were held at the same prison as Palić in Bijeljina until late August 1995. However, the two men were transferred to another prison and eventually released after the signing of the Dayton Accords. The Republika Srpska government has concluded that on 5 September 1995 a VRS military officer came to the prison in Bijeljina and took Palić with him, after which he was never seen again.

Since the end of the war through the day that the remains of Palić were positively identified his widow Esma campaigned to force the government of Republika Srpska to investigate the case, locate the remains and prosecute the killers. During the campaign Esma Palić has filed lawsuits in the Constitutional Court of Bosnia and Herzegovina and the European Court of Human Rights in Strasbourg. She has also petitioned the Office of the High Representative in Sarajevo. Amnesty International and other human rights groups have also made efforts to get publicize the case. In January 2002 the government of Republika Srpska paid Esma Palic 65,000 KM in compensation.

The remains of Palić and eight other men were found in a mass grave near the village of Vragolovi in the municipality of Rogatica, near Žepa in November 2001. The remains were prepared for DNA analysis in June 2002. The first attempt to match the DNA from the remains to DNA samples provided by Palić's sister and daughters as well as samples extracted from the remains of Palić's father who died in 1992 were unsuccessful. The reason for the failed identification was that the sample did not yield enough genetic materials for a match.

Starting in November 2008 the laboratory charged with identifying the remains of people killed during the war began to reexamine all remains that had not been matched to any DNA samples provided by relatives in the database. A second analysis of Palić's remains was conducted in late July 2009 using more sophisticated methods and yielded a positive match. Since 2002, the remains had been buried in a cemetery for unidentified victims of the war in Visoko. In light of the second, positive match, Palić's body was re-exhumed on 12 August 2009, and sent for a third analysis at the request of Esma Palić.

On 26 August 2009, Palić was buried on the grounds of the Ali Pasha's Mosque in Sarajevo with several thousand people in attendance.

== See also ==
- List of solved missing person cases
- Naser Orić
- Operations Krivaja '95 and Stupčanica '95
