= Zdravko Tolimir =

Bosnian Serb military commander

Zdravko Tolimir Здравко Толимир
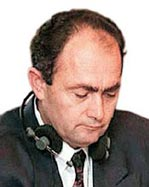
- Born: 27 November 1948; Glamoč, Bosnia and Herzegovina, Yugoslavia
- Died: 9 February 2016 (aged 67) The Hague, Netherlands
- Allegiance: Republika Srpska
- Branch: Army of Republika Srpska (VRS)
- Conflicts: Bosnian War: Siege of Goražde; Siege of Srebrenica; Siege of Žepa

Zdravko Tolimir (Serbian Cyrillic: Здравко Толимир; 27 November 1948 – 9 February 2016) was a Bosnian Serb military commander and war criminal, convicted of genocide, conspiracy to commit genocide, extermination, murder, persecution on ethnic grounds and forced transfer. Tolimir was a commander of the Army of Republika Srpska during the Bosnian War. He was Assistant Commander of Intelligence and Security for the Bosnian Serb army and reported directly to the commander, General Ratko Mladić.

He died serving a life sentence for war crimes in Scheveningen prison in 2016.

== Early life ==
Tolimir was born in Glamoč, Bosnia and Herzegovina, which was a part of Yugoslavia at the time.

== Bosnian War ==
According to the International Criminal Tribunal for the former Yugoslavia (ICTY) indictment, Tolimir was aware of the program aimed at expelling Bosniaks from Srebrenica and Žepa, and he willingly participated in the project. On 9 July 1995, when President Radovan Karadžić passed down an order to seize Srebrenica, the order was passed directly through Tolimir. In Žepa, Tolimir was alleged to have told the Bosniaks that they or the Serbs of Bosnia would launch a military operation.

On 21 July 1995, Tolimir sent a report to General Radomir Miletic, acting Chief of General Staff of the Bosnian Serb Army (VRS), requesting help to crush some Bosnian military strongholds and expressing his view that "the best way to do it would be to use chemical weapons". In the same report, Tolimir went even further, proposing chemical strikes against refugee columns of women, children and elderly leaving Žepa, because that would "force the Muslim fighters to surrender quickly", in his opinion.

== Arrest and trial ==
On 31 May 2007, Tolimir was detained by the authorities in Bosnia and Herzegovina after having been on the run for two years. Tolimir had negotiated with the Serbian government concerning his surrender to The Hague tribunal. He was handed to NATO personnel at the Banja Luka Airport on 31 May 2007, after being apprehended in Serbia.

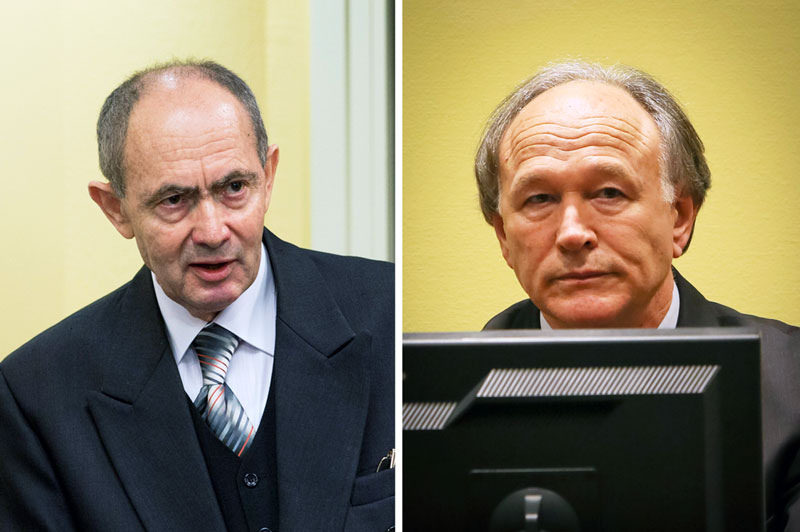
Tolimir and Vlastimir Đorđević at the Hague.

An ICTY representative formally read him the ICTY indictment while still at Banja Luka, and then NATO forces formally arrested him and took him to the NATO base in Sarajevo. NATO forces brought him to Rotterdam on 1 June 2007, and turned over custody of him to The Tribunal, which brought him to The Hague the same day. He was charged with crimes against humanity, genocide, and war crimes for his involvement in the Srebrenica genocide and the murder of Bosniak prisoners temporarily held in the Bratunac and Zvornik regions after the Srebrenica win by Serb forces. The indictment alleges Tolimir supervised the VRS detachment which executed more than 1,700 men and boys at the Branjevo Military Farm and the Pilica Cultural Centre.

On 5 October 2007, the registry of the ICTY announced their assessment of Tolimir's health as "grave, fragile and highly alarming", and that Tolimir was refusing blood pressure treatment for an inoperable brain aneurysm. He had previously stated that he planned to represent himself during the trial.

On 12 December 2012, Tolimir was convicted of six out of eight counts; genocide, conspiracy to commit genocide, extermination, murder, persecution on ethnic grounds and forced transfer. The chamber sentenced him to life imprisonment. On 8 April 2015, the ICTY confirmed his life sentence.

== Death ==
Tolimir died in Scheveningen prison on 8 February 2016 due to natural causes while awaiting transfer to a state where he would serve his sentence.
