= United Nations Security Council Resolution 819 =

UN Security Council Resolution 819
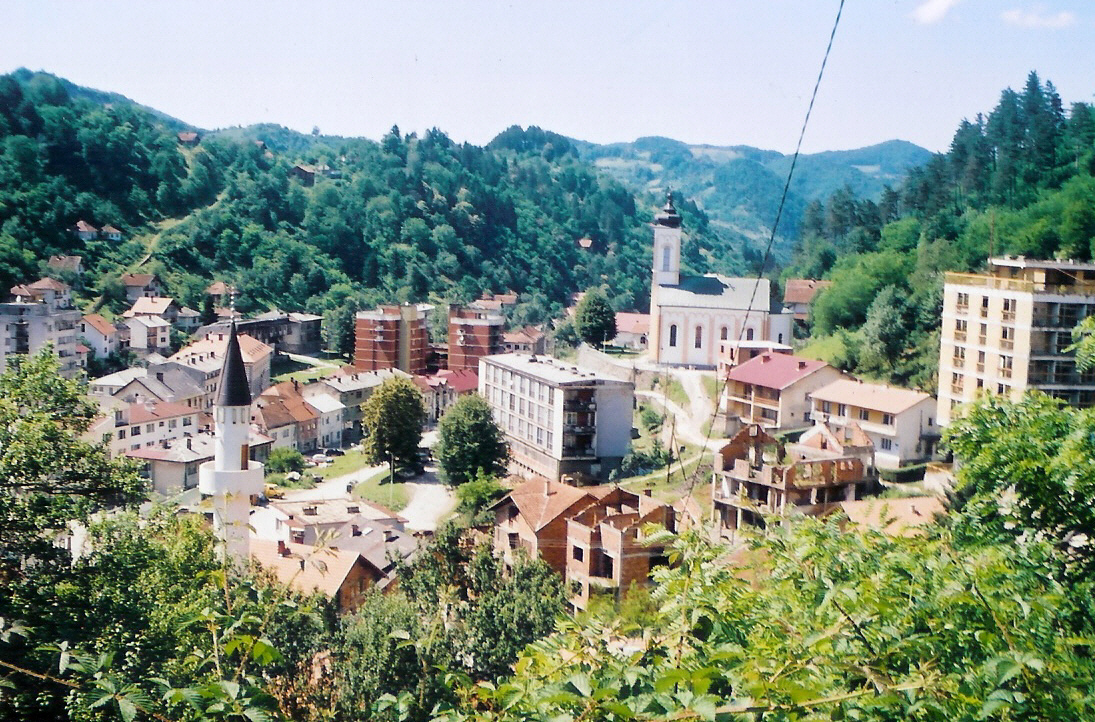
- Srebrenica
- Date: 16 April 1993
- Meeting no.: 3,199
- Code: S/RES/819 (Document)
- Subject: Bosnia and Herzegovina
- Voting summary: 15 voted for; None voted against; None abstained
- Result: Adopted

Security Council composition
- Permanent members: China; France; Russia; United Kingdom; United States
- Non-permanent members: Brazil; Cape Verde; Djibouti; Hungary; Japan; Morocco; New Zealand; Pakistan; Spain; Venezuela

United Nations Security Council resolution 819, adopted unanimously on 16 April 1993, after reaffirming resolutions 713 (1991) and all (1992) subsequent resolutions, the Council expressed concern at the actions of Bosnian Serb paramilitary units in towns and villages in eastern Bosnia and Herzegovina, including attacks on civilians, the United Nations Protection Force and disruption to humanitarian aid convoys. The resolution marked the UN's first civilian "safe area" being declared; it failed to prevent the Srebrenica massacre.

== Resolution ==
Acting under Chapter VII of the United Nations Charter, the Council went on to demand that all parties and others concerned treat Srebrenica and its surroundings as a safe area which should be free from any armed attack or any other hostile act, further demanding the cessation of all hostilities and withdrawal by Bosnian Serb paramilitary forces from areas around Srebrenica. This was the first instance of a civilian "safe area" being declared in the world. It also demanded that Federal Republic of Yugoslavia (Serbia and Montenegro) cease supplying weapons, military equipment and other services to Bosnian Serb paramilitary units in Bosnia and Herzegovina.

The resolution then requested the Secretary-General Boutros Boutros-Ghali to increase the presence of the protection force in Srebrenica and surrounding areas requesting full co-operation from parties and others concerned and for Boutros-Ghali to report thereon to the council. 147 peacekeepers were later deployed to reassure Bosnian Serb General Ratko Mladic that the town would not be used as a base to attack his forces. It also reaffirmed that the acquisition of territory by threat or use of force, particularly through ethnic cleansing, is unlawful and unacceptable in international humanitarian law. The council condemned the "abhorrent campaign of ethnic cleansing" by the Bosnian Serb paramilitaries and its actions of forcing the evacuation of the civilian population from Srebrenica.

Regarding humanitarian aid, the council demanded the unimpeded delivery of humanitarian assistance to all areas of Bosnia and Herzegovina and in particular to the civilian population of Srebrenica and that any disruption to the delivery constitutes a violation of international humanitarian law. It then urged the secretary-general and the United Nations High Commissioner for Refugees to reinforce the existing humanitarian operations in the region.

Finally, Resolution 819 demanded that all parties ensure the safety of the protection force, United Nations personnel and other international organisations, allowing for the safe transfer of injured civilians from Srebrenica and its surrounding areas, and announced its decision to send a mission of members of the security council to assess the situation in Bosnia and Herzegovina. The "safe area" would later be extended to other towns including Tuzla, Žepa, Bihać, Goražde and Sarajevo in Resolution 824.

== Ineffectiveness ==
Despite its preemptive wording, Resolution 819 failed to prevent the Srebrenica massacre in July 1995, when the United Nations Protection Force were taken prisoner and the refugees from the fallen enclave fell into the hands of the forces of Bosnian Serb General Ratko Mladić, subsequently indicted by the International Criminal Tribunal for the Former Yugoslavia for war crimes including genocide.

In his chronology of events at Srebrenica, Under the UN Flag, the genocide survivor Hasan Nuhanović criticises members of the international community involved on the ground or indirectly influencing or capable of influencing events for specific failures to fulfil their responsibility to protect the Muslim population of the besieged "safe area" under Resolution 819.

== See also ==
- Breakup of Yugoslavia
- Bosnian Genocide
- Bosnian War
- Croatian War of Independence
- List of United Nations Security Council Resolutions 801 to 900 (1993–1994)
- Yugoslav Wars
- List of United Nations Security Council Resolutions related to the conflicts in former Yugoslavia
