= United Nations Safe Areas =

Humanitarian corridors in Bosnia and Herzegovina established in 1993

United Nations Safe Areas
- - Bosnian: Sigurne zone Ujedinjenih nacija
  - Arabic: مناطق الأمم المتحدة الآمنة
  - Chinese: 联合国安全区
  - French: Zones de sécurité des Nations Unies
  - Russian: Безопасные зоны Организации Объединенных Наций
  - Spanish: Áreas seguras de las Naciones Unidas
- Insignia of the United Nations Protection Force

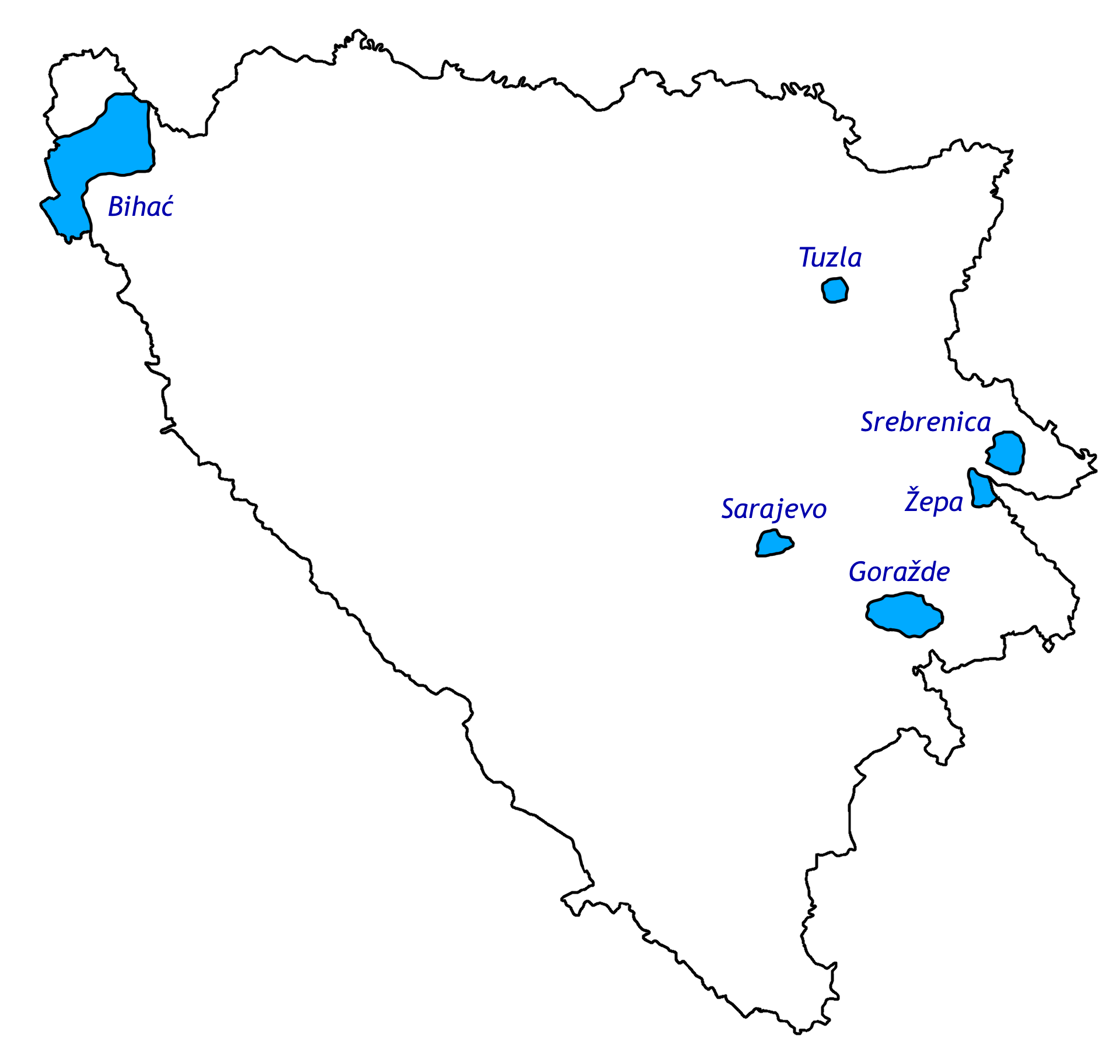
- Map of the UN Safe Areas after the UNSC resolution 819 and 824.
- Formation: 16 April 1993
- Dissolved: 14 December 1995
- Location(s): Bosnia and Herzegovina
- Official languages: Bosnian and official languages of the United Nations
- Lieutenant-General: Lars-Eric Wahlgren

United Nations Safe Areas were humanitarian corridors established in 1993 in the territory of Bosnia and Herzegovina during the Bosnian War by several resolutions of the United Nations Security Council.

On 16 April 1993, with the United Nations Security Council Resolution 819 the Srebrenica enclave was declared a safe area. On 6 May 1993, the United Nations Security Council Resolution 824 further extended the status to Sarajevo, Žepa, Goražde, Tuzla and Bihać. These cities and territories were placed under the protection of the UN peacekeeping units UNPROFOR.

The establishment of the UN Safe Areas is considered today to be one of the most controversial decisions of the United Nations. The resolutions were unclear about the procedure by which these safe areas were to be protected in a war zone like Bosnia and Herzegovina. The resolution created a difficult diplomatic situation because the member states that voted in favor of it were, for political reasons, not willing to take the necessary steps to ensure the security of the safe areas.

In 1995 the situation in UN Safe Areas was deteriorating, and it led to a diplomatic crisis which culminated in the Srebrenica massacre; one of the worst atrocities in Europe since World War II. The Security Council Resolution 819 and 836 had designated Srebrenica a "safe area" to be protected using "all necessary means, including the use of force". Continued attacks on UN Safe Areas as well as the continued Siege of Sarajevo also ultimately resulted in NATO intervention in Bosnia and Herzegovina named Operation Deliberate Force.

By the end of the war every one of the Safe Areas had been attacked by the Army of Republika Srpska, and Srebrenica and Žepa were overrun.

== See also ==
- Safe Zone (Syria)
- Demilitarized zone
