= Žepa =

Žepa Жепа
- Village
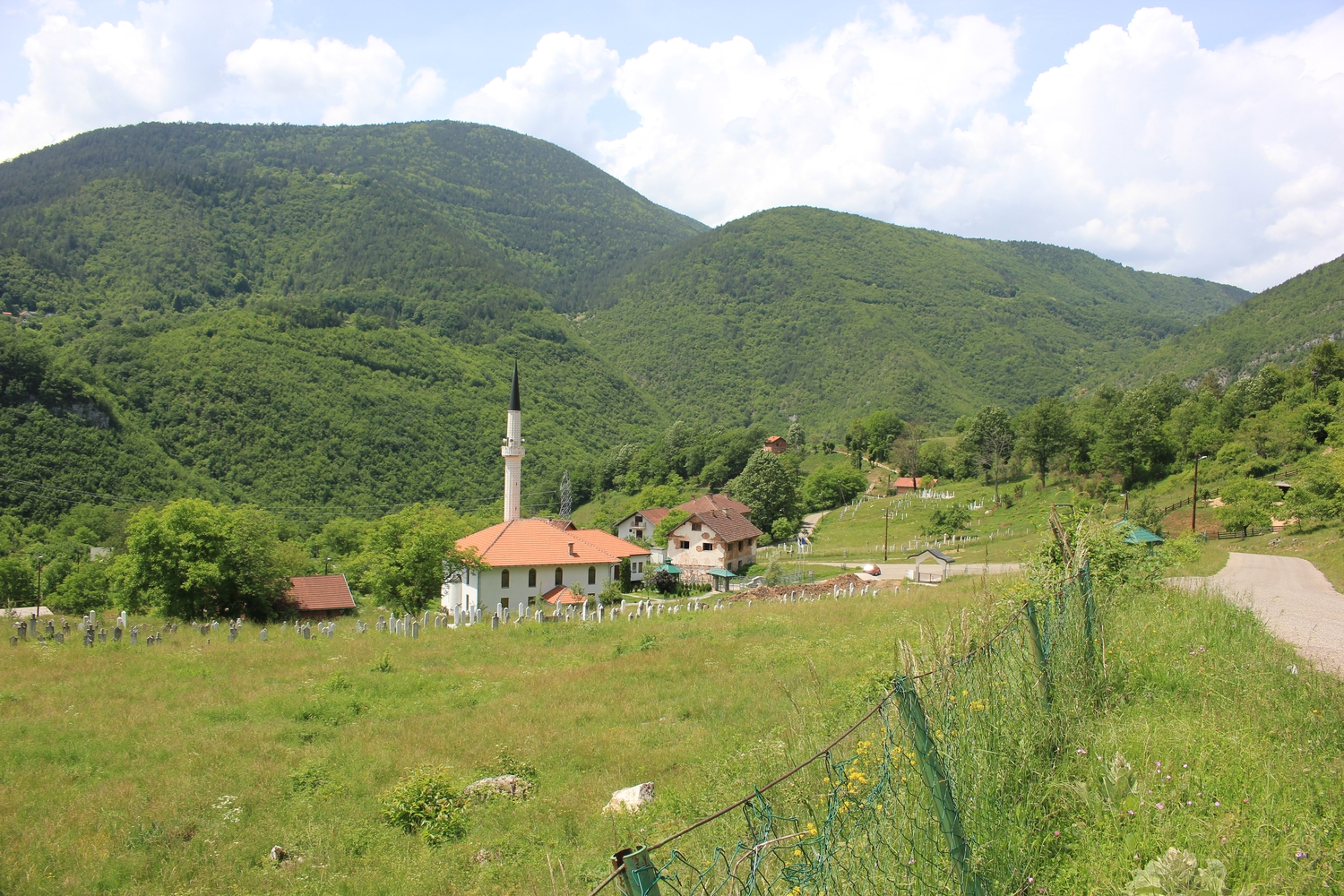
- Žepa Mosque

- Location of Žepa
- Coordinates: 43°57′N 19°07′E
- Country: Bosnia and Herzegovina
- Entity: Republika Srpska
- Municipality: Rogatica

Area
  - Total: 4.85 km^{2} (1.87 sq mi)
- Elevation: 467 m (1,532 ft)

Population (2013)
  - Total: 133
  - Density: 27.4/km^{2} (71.0/sq mi)
- Time zone: UTC+1 (CET)
  - Summer (DST): UTC+2 (CEST)
- Area code: +387 58

Žepa (Serbian Cyrillic: Жепа) is a village located in the municipality of Rogatica, Bosnia and Herzegovina. As of 2013 census, it has a population of 133 inhabitants. It is situated northeast of Rogatica itself on the banks of short river with a same name, the Žepa River, which flows into the Drina river nearby, in a valley between the mountains Javor and Devetak.

== History ==
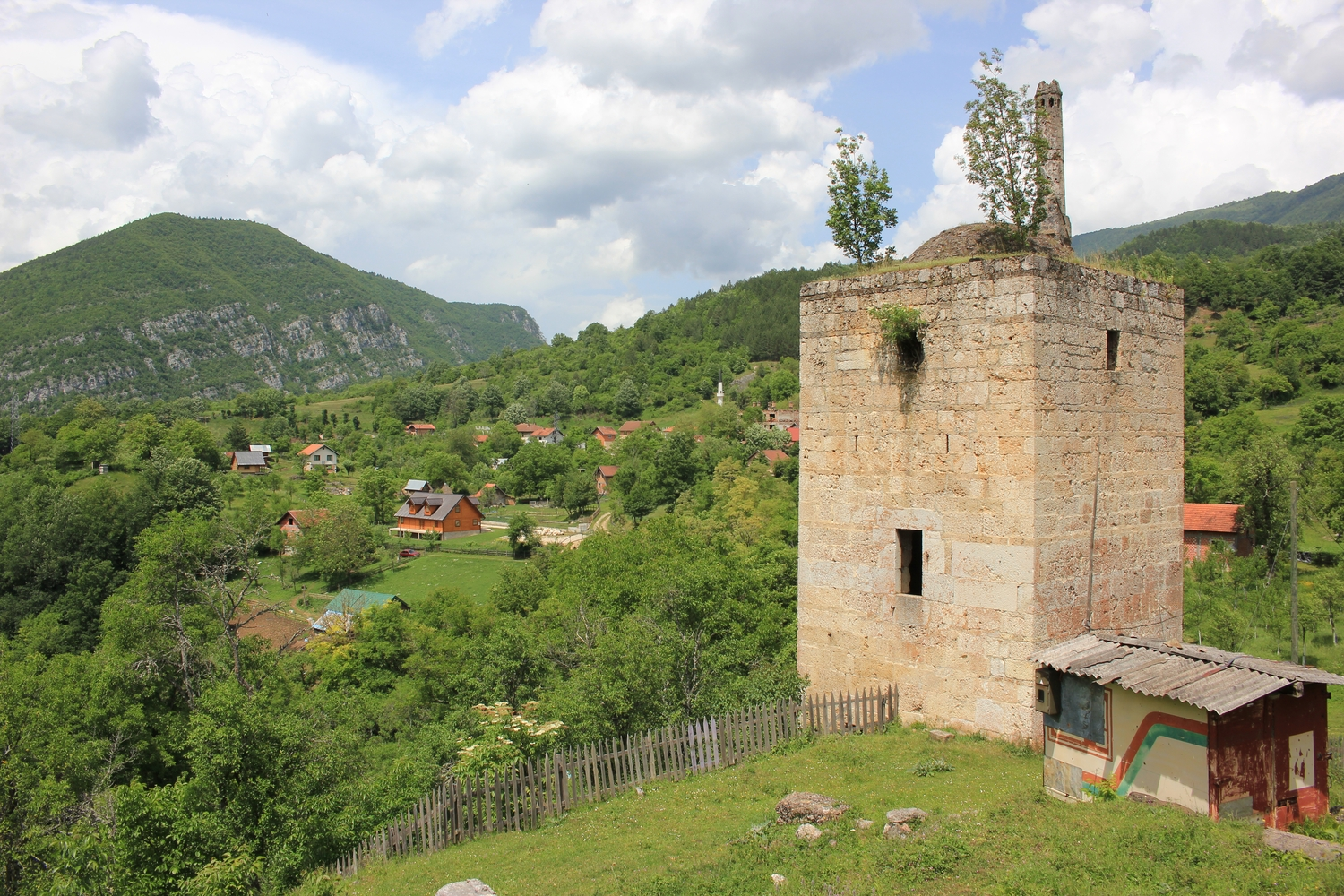
The tower of Redžep Paša in Žepa

=== Bosnian War ===
During the Bosnian War (1992–95), Žepa became one of three Bosniak enclaves in eastern Bosnia surrounded by the Army of the Republika Srpska (VRS), along with Srebrenica, a short distance downstream, and Goražde farther upstream, after other towns such as Foča, Bratunac and Zvornik were taken by the VRS. In 1993, the town was declared a United Nations safe area and had a small Ukrainian Army unit of UNPROFOR peacekeepers stationed there. The Bosniak military commander of the enclave was Colonel Avdo Palić, who disappeared soon after the town was captured by the VRS on 25 July 1995. According to eyewitness accounts, he was murdered at the orders of VRS General Ratko Mladić. 116 Bosniaks were killed in the takeover.

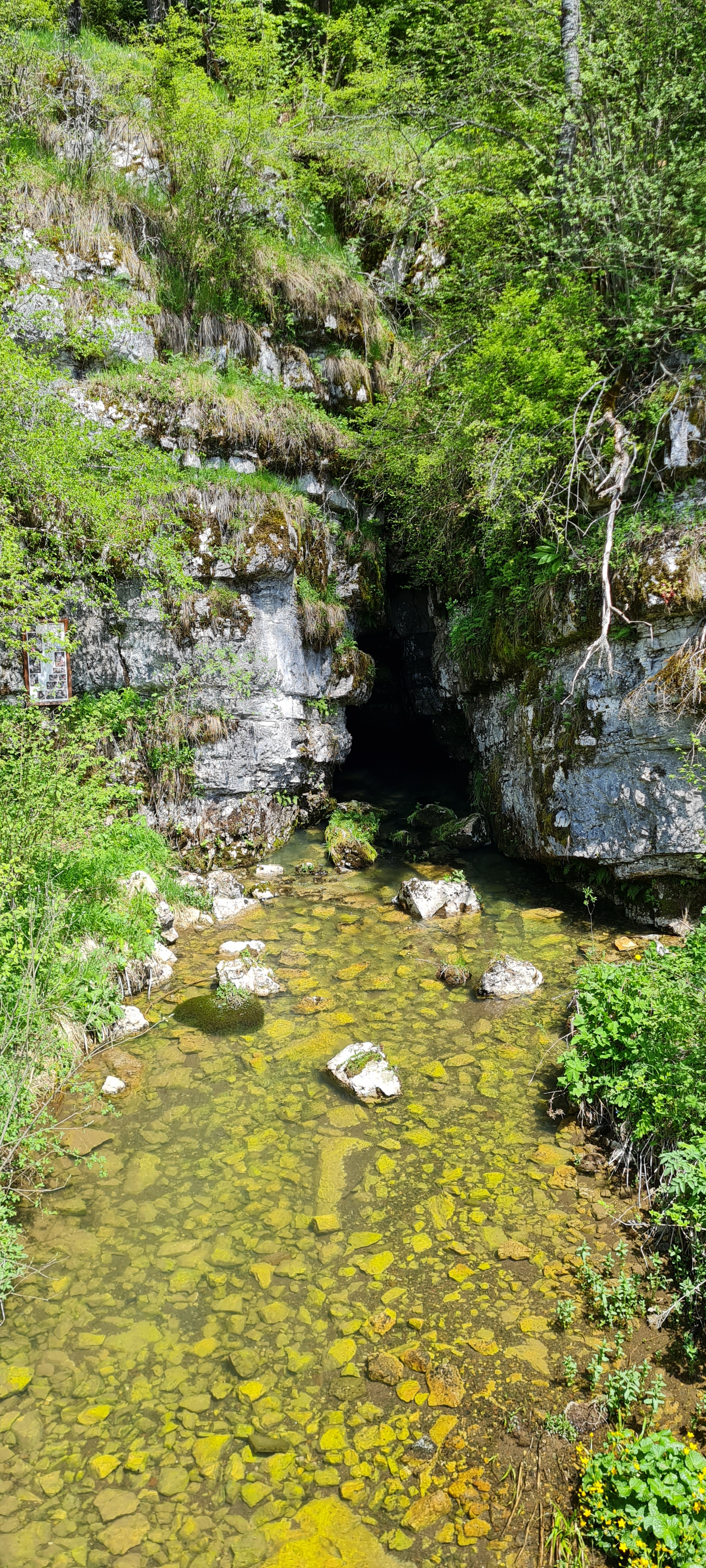
Velika Komnica Cave - source of Žepa River

Unlike in Srebrenica, a widespread slaughter of Bosniak men did not occur, as most Bosniak males had fled the enclave by the time Bosnian Serb forces arrived. Meanwhile, Bosniak women, children and the elderly were deported to Sarajevo. An important role in the peaceful evacuation of the population of Žepa was played by the participation in the negotiations of the representative of the UN command, Colonel of the Armed Forces of Ukraine Mykola Verkhohliad. As a result of the agreements, the Bosnian population was evacuated from Žepa with the help of Ukrainian servicemen. In the trial of Zdravko Tolimir, who was implicated in the Srebrenica massacre, the trial chamber had found that the killings of the three top Bosniak civilian and military leaders of Žepa, and the conduct of the forcible transfer of the population, met the terms satisfying genocide, in combination with the Srebrenica massacre. The appeals chamber of the ICTY however, reversed these convictions regarding the events in Žepa as qualifying as genocidal acts, however it was reaffirmed that the Bosnian Muslims of Srebrenica, Žepa, Goražde and "Eastern Bosnia and Herzegovina in general", were members of the targeted group and thus "the ultimate victims of the genocidal enterprise against the Muslims, of Eastern Bosnia and Herzegovina".

== Demographics ==
As of 1991 census, the village had a population of 462 inhabitants, of which 450 (97.4%) were Bosniaks and 12 others. As of 2013 census, it has a population of 133 inhabitants, majority of whom are Bosniaks 132 (99.2%).
