= Assault on Majevica (1995) =

Offensive attack in the Bosnian War

- Part of the Bosnian war
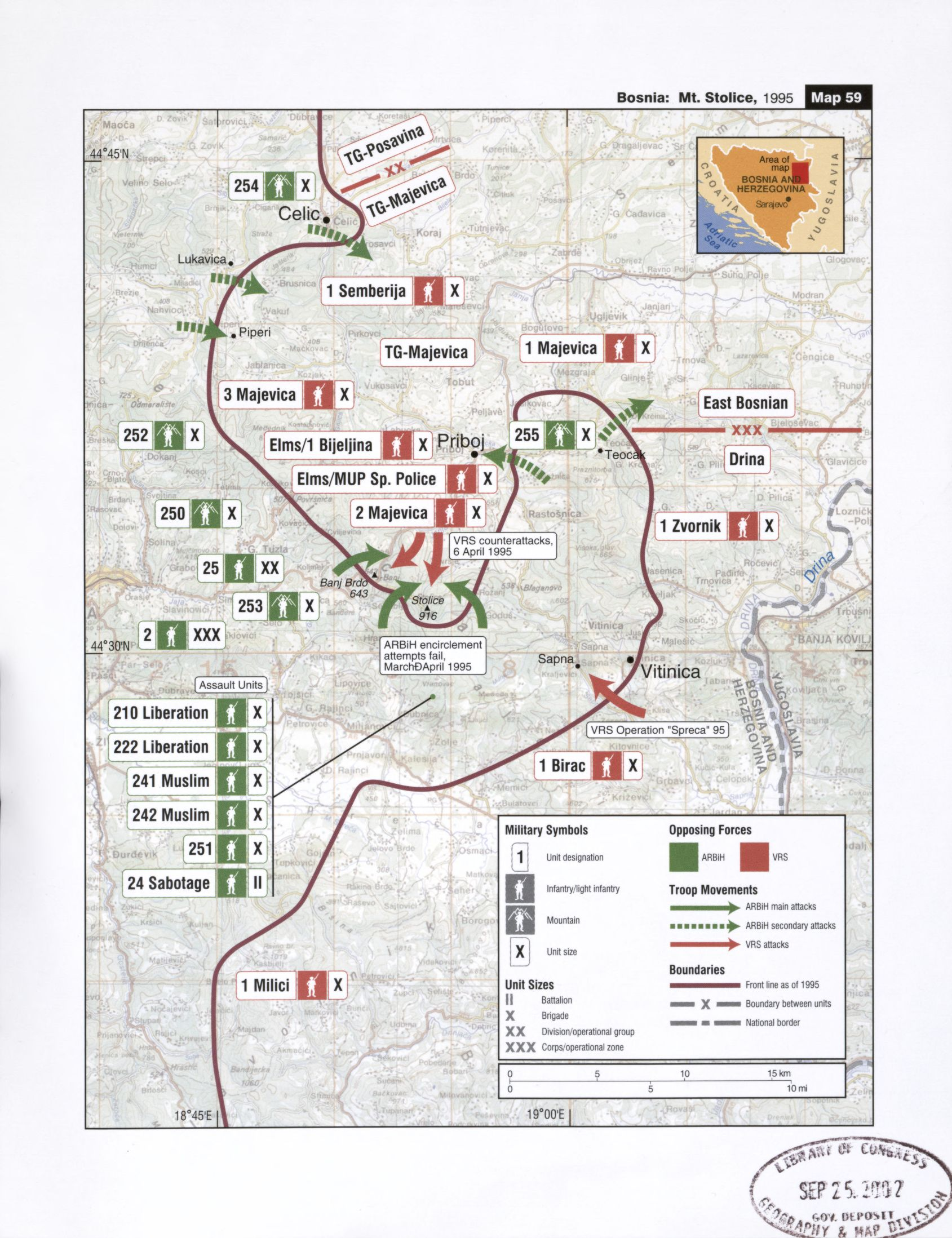
Date	20 March – 7 April 1995
Location	Majevica and surrounding areas
Result	Despite heavy casualties on both sides, ARBiH failed to capture the strategic Mount Stolice summit and radio and television transmitter

Belligerents
Republika Srpska	Bosnia and Herzegovina

Commanders and leaders
Unknown	Refik Lendo

Units involved
Army of Republika Srpska; Tactical Group Majevica; 1st Bijeljina Light Infantry Brigade; 3rd Military Police Battalion; MUP Special Police detachment	Army of Republic of Bosnia and Herzegovina; 2nd Corps; 25th Division

Strength
6,000	14,000

Casualties and losses
Heavy	Heavy

In March and April 1995 during the last year of the Bosnian War, the Army of the Republic of Bosnia and Herzegovina (ARBiH) attacked several heights around Mount Stolice – the highest peak within the Majevica mountain range in northeastern Bosnia and Herzegovina – in an attempt to encircle and then capture it from the Army of Republika Srpska (VRS) defenders. Despite ARBiH success in surrounding the summit of Mount Stolice and its important radio and television transmitter after heavy casualties were suffered on both sides, VRS reserves counterattacked and lifted the blockade. The ARBiH made no further attempts to capture the summit for the remainder of the war. The transmitter was destroyed by a North Atlantic Treaty Organisation airstrike in late August 1995, and territory of Mount Stolice was transferred to the Federation of Bosnia and Herzegovina as part of the Dayton Agreement that ended the Bosnian War.

== Background and opposing forces ==
During the Bosnian War spring of 1994, the Army of the Republic of Bosnia and Herzegovina (ARBiH) had attempted to capture the radio and television transmitters on both Mount Vlašić in central Bosnia and Herzegovina near the town of Travnik, and Mount Stolice, the highest peak in the Majevica mountains in northeastern Bosnia, located east of the city of Tuzla. These attacks on Army of Republika Srpska (VRS) positions had both failed, despite temporarily capturing portions of both mountains and of the surrounding hills. On the last day of 1994 a ceasefire agreement between the two sides was concluded. The agreement was planned to last until the end of April 1995, but once the spring thaw began, the ARBiH made preparations to make another attempt to capture both transmitters. Possession of the Majevica mountains meant that VRS artillery deployed there could strike most of northeastern Bosnia held by the ARBiH, including Tuzla, and the ARBiH remained very focussed on pushing the VRS out of artillery range of Tuzla in particular.

The ARBiH troops earmarked for the assault on Majevica were part of Brigadier General Sead Delić's 2nd Corps, which transferred almost all of its elite formations to Colonel Refik Lendo's 25th Division sector of the front line for the attack. Delić may also have given the neighboring 24th Division temporary command over part of the 25th Division's sector southeast of Mount Stolice in order to better control the large number of formations deployed in the area during the offensive. The main assault grouping consisted of around 6,000 elite troops. Transferred from the 24th Division were the 210th Liberation Brigade "Nesib Malkić", the 241st and 242nd Muslim Light Brigades, the 24th Independent Sabotage Battalion "Black Wolves", and the 24th Antiterrorist Company "Živinice Wasps". The 22nd Division contributed the 222nd Liberation Brigade, and the 25th Division's own 251st Light Brigade made up the balance of the assault force. They were supported by 8,000 troops from the 25th Division mountain brigades that held the sector of the front line around Majevica: the 250th north of Gornja Tuzla; the 252nd north of Dokanj; the 253rd directly opposite the important VRS-held height of Banj Brdo (643 m (2,110 ft)); the 254th to the north around Čelić; and the 255th Mountain Brigade "Hajrudin Mešić" in the salient around Teočak. The assault force also had the support of a handful of tanks and artillery pieces.

The VRS defenders were part of Tactical Group Majevica, a divisional-sized formation of Major General Novica Simić's East Bosnian Corps. TG-Majevica consisted of four brigades and around 6,000 troops. TG-Majevica had the support of a battalion of the 3rd Mixed Artillery Regiment equipped with 155 mm (6.1 in) howitzers, and during the previous year most of the brigades had a company of World War II-vintage T-34 tanks under command. Mount Stolice (916 m (3,005 ft)) and the important nearby height of Banj Brdo (643 m (2,110 ft)) were both defended by the 2nd Majevica Light Infantry Brigade. The front line northwest of the ARBiH objective was held by the 3rd Majevica Brigade in the vicinity of Lopare, with the 1st Semberija Brigade northwest of Lopare. The VRS front line to the northeast of Mount Stolice was held by the 1st Majevica Brigade in the vicinity of Ugljevik. To the east of the ARBiH-held salient including towns of Teočak and Sapna, the VRS front line was held by the Drina Corps. VRS reserves at the nearby town of Bijeljina included the 1st Bijeljina Light Infantry Brigade – known as the "Panthers", the 3rd Military Police Battalion, and the elite Ministry of Interior (MUP) Special Police detachment, all of which could be deployed for counterattacks as needed.

== Attacks ==
The main thrust of the assault commencing on 20 March was against Mount Stolice and nearby Banj Brdo, but secondary attacks were launched along the front line between Čelić and Teočak. The ARBiH formations involved in the main assault suffered very heavy casualties on the first day of the offensive, with many advancing infantry caught by VRS artillery fire. Fierce close-quarter fighting ensued around Mount Stolice and Banj Brdo, and also around other nearby heights like Mount Kolijevka and Mala Jelica Hill, as the ARBiH attempted to envelop Mount Stolice using pincers assaulting from the southwest and southeast. Driving snow and severe cold slowed the ARBiH assault in the afternoon, and the following day the offensive had all but stopped. Heavy fighting resumed on 23 March, and despite the very poor weather conditions, United Nations (UN) military observers reported over 2,700 detonations in less than 24 hours. The freedom of movement of the UN observers was restricted, but by 24 March they cautiously reported that the ARBiH had made some gains, and were very close to the Mount Stolice transmission tower. On the same day, Republika Srpska president Radovan Karadžić promised a counter-offensive, and the following day UN observers were reporting that the ARBiH had captured about 50 km^{2} (19 sq mi) of territory surrounding the transmitter, but had not captured the tower itself. Both ARBiH and VRS acknowledged they had suffered heavy losses in the fighting to this point.

On 25 and 26 March, the VRS retaliated for the attacks on both Mount Vlašić and Mount Stolice by heavy shelling of Muslim-held towns across Bosnia and Herzegovina. The promised counteroffensive materialised at the same time, led by the MUP Special Police detachment, 3rd Military Police Battalion, and 1st Bijeljina Light Infantry Brigade, and managed to break the encirclement, although the resulting resupply route across a small stream was tenuous. The extent of the fighting reduced over the next few days due to the heavy blanket of snow. In an attempt to draw VRS reserves away from the main objective, the ARBiH 2nd Corps launched secondary attacks in the Piperi–Lukavica area to the northwest and the Priboj area to the northeast, but the entrenched VRS defenders held on. To avoid a frontal assault, the 2nd Corps continued its encirclement tactics and used radio to call on the VRS garrison to surrender the tower and station intact, but neither approach was successful.

On 4 April, the ARBiH renewed the assault in milder weather. They were again able to surround the summit, but were unable to capture the tower and transmitter. Two days later the same VRS forces that had broken the encirclement with their counterattack a week earlier, backed by artillery support, launched a coordinated assault which recaptured Banj Brdo and another nearby height by the end of 7 April, lifting the ARBiH blockade. By mid-April it was clear to all that the ARBiH attempt to capture the tower and transmitter on Mount Stolice had fallen just short of success, and the price had been high. The 2nd Corps suffered hundreds of casualties, many of them as a result of frostbite. Such losses were unsustainable for ARBiH's largest corps. From this point on, the ARBiH made occasional probes, and exchanges of artillery fire continued along the front line in the sector, but the ARBiH did not make another concerted attempt to capture Mount Stolice for the remainder of the war.

== Analysis and aftermath ==
The margin of failure for the ARBiH assault was not great, and the main factors in their defeat were a critically timed snowstorm on the first day of the assault, superior VRS firepower, and the availability and quality of the VRS counterattack forces. A VRS soldier told a reporter that they would not have held Mount Stolice if it were not for the snowstorm and the MUP Special Police detachment. On 30 August, the VRS-held transmitter was destroyed by a North Atlantic Treaty Organisation airstrike, part of Operation Deliberate Force, an air campaign against the VRS launched following the Srebrenica massacre in July and the second Markale massacre in Sarajevo in late August. As a consequence of the signing of the Dayton Agreement which ended the Bosnian War, both Mount Stolice and Banj Brdo were shifted to the Federation of Bosnia and Herzegovina side of the Inter-Entity Boundary Line. In 2023, the mayors of all five Republika Srpska and Federation municipalities in the Majevica area combined to work on projects aimed at economic and infrastructure reform, as well as boosting tourism.
