= Priboj Offensives =

1992 Bosnian War offensives

- Part of the Bosnian War
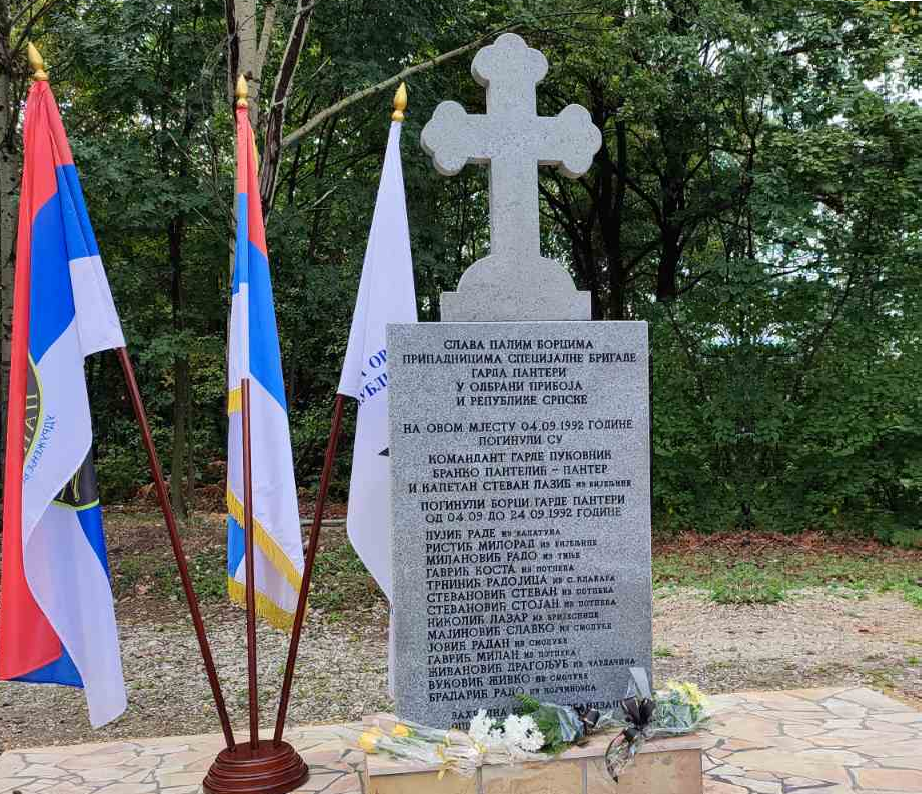
Date	3 September — 24 September 1992
Location	Priboj and the surroundings
Result	Army of Republika Srpska Victory

Belligerents
Republika Srpska	Bosnia and Herzegovina

Commanders and leaders
(Republika Srpska) Ljubiša Savić (Republika Srpska) Branko Pantelić †	(Bosnia and Herzegovina) Hajrudin Mešić

Units involved
Army of Republika Srpska; Garda Panteri	Army of the Republic of Bosnia and Herzegovina; 1st Teočak Brigade

Casualties and losses
16 Killed	Unknown

Priboj Offensives were series of fighting during the Bosnian War between the Army of Republika Srpska (VRS) and Army of the Republic of Bosnia and Herzegovina (ARBiH). Immediately after the deblocking of Teočak, ARBiH began a offensive in which it tried to capture Priboj, Brijest, remaining parts of Rastošnica and Panjik hill which were under control of the VRS. In the beginning ARBiH captured 12 km², however the Army of Republika Srpska did a counteroffensive and regained the territory. Fighting lasted from 3rd to 24th September 1992.

== Background ==
Majevica was strategically important during the Bosnian War, because a key radio-tower was stationed on it which allowed communication, television broadcasting and telephone services. Controlling the mountain would have significant implications from both sides, because it would enable them to disrupt the military operations of their opponents. By holding part of the mountain, Serbs and Bosniaks could threaten each other's territory in northwestern Bosnia, making it a very important strategic location in the war.

In July and August battles were fought for deblocking of Teočak, which was deblocked in mid-August. Military unit „Panthers'' were on Ozren and were preparing a evacuation of the civilian population of Smoluća.

== Offensives ==
=== ARBiH offensive ===
On 3rd September 1992 ARBiH units under Captain Hajrudin Mešić began a big offensive. The same day Garda Panteri arrives to the battleground. ARBiH captures the remaining 3km² of Rastošnica. The 1st Teočak Brigade on 4th September captured Panjik hill where Bosnian Serb Lieutenant Colonel Branko Pantelić dies during the fight. On the same day falls the village of Brijest, and the ARBiH units arrive to the enterances of Priboj. ArbiH took 12 km² in this offensive, the fights that followed were intense and long.

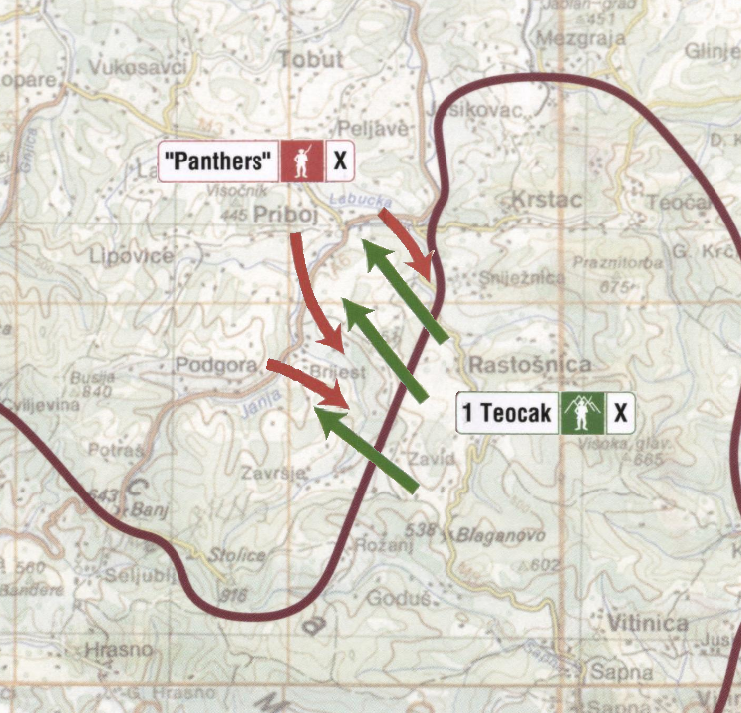
Offensives in Priboj and Teočak in 1992

=== VRS Counteroffensive ===
On 5th September 1992 Garda Panteri began a counterffensive to regain lost territory. On 6th September ARBiH was already pushed out of Priboj. On 19th September fighting continued in which the VRS took back Brijest, Panjik Hill and 3 km² of Rastošnica, however on 21st September the units under Hajrudin Mešić halt the advance of Garda Panteri and pushes them back a few hundred meters. In the following 3 days Panthers stabilized the frontline and stopped further ARBiH advances towards Panjik hill.

== Consequences ==
Ljubiša Savić took command of the Serb Unit and renamed the unit into Garda Panteri in honor of Branko Pantelić.

A Monument was made on Panjik for Branko Pantelić, Stevan Lazić and 14 other dead Serb Soldiers.
