= Garda Panteri =

- Emblem of Garda Panteri
- Active: 1992–1996
- Allegiance: Republika Srpska
- Branch: Army of Republika Srpska
- Type: Light infantry
- Size: 2,000
- Part of: East Bosnia Corps
- Nickname: Panteri
- Patron: Branko Pantelić
- Colors: Red; Blue; White
- Mascot: Panther
- Anniversaries: 2 May
- Vehicles: Kamion FAP-13, OT M-60 P, M53/59 Praga, T-55, TAM 110, TAM 5000, Terenski Automobile, T-34
- Engagements: Bosnian War; Majevica front (1992–1995); Operation Corridor 92; Operation Corridor '93; Operation Cerska '93; Operation Sadejstvo; Operation Lukavac '93; Attack on Stolice; Operation Brana '94; Operation Breza '94; Operation Autumn '94; Operation Shield '94; Assault on Majevica (1995); Priboj Offensives
- Decorations: Order of Nemanjići Order of Karađorđe's Star

Commanders
- 1st Commander: Branko “Panter” Pantelić †
- 2nd Commander: Ljubiša "Mauzer" Savić
- 3rd Commander: Ljubiša "Ljuti" Lazić

Aircraft flown
- Antonov An-2, UTVA-75

The Garda Panteri (Note: Serbian Cyrillic: Гарда Пантери, "Panthers Guard". Also known as the 1st Bijeljina Light Infantry Brigade (Serbian Cyrillic: Прва бијељинска лака пјешадијска бригада) or Special Brigade Panthers Guard (Serbian Cyrillic: Специјална бригада Гарда Пантери).) was an elite unit in the Army of Republika Srpska during the Bosnian War. It was founded on 2 May 1992 under the initial name of the Serbian National Guard of SAO Semberija and Majevica, (Note: Serbian: Српска национална гарда од САО Семберија и Мајевица, Srpska Nacionalna Garda od SAO Semberija i Majevica.) adopting the name "Garda Panteri" in honour of their previous fallen commander Branko "Panter" Pantelić by Ljubiša Savić and members of the Serbian Solidarity Fund. It fought in the Bosnian War from 1992–1996 during the Yugoslav Wars.

== History and organization ==
=== Establishment and the Takeover of Bijeljina ===
During late 1991 and early 1992, local Serb leadership in Semberija and Majevica established the "Serb Solidarity Fund," led by Ljubiša Savić ("Mauzer"). Formed amidst rising political tensions in Bosnia and Herzegovina, the organization mobilized between 1,000 and 2,000 armed volunteers to secure local infrastructure. Tensions escalated in Bijeljina during late March 1992. Local Serb officials claimed that militia affiliated with the Bosniak-led Party of Democratic Action (SDA) erected barricades to seize control of municipal institutions. However, findings by the International Criminal Tribunal for the former Yugoslavia (ICTY) and human rights organizations established that the events formed part of a planned takeover of the municipality by Serb paramilitary forces.

On March 31, 1992, Željko Ražnatović ("Arkan") arrived in Bijeljina with the Serb Volunteer Guard ("Arkan's Tigers"). Working alongside Savić's volunteers and local militias, Ražnatović's unit took control of key administrative buildings and broadcast facilities. The operation resulted in the Bijeljina massacre, during which dozens of Bosniak civilians were killed and others forcibly expelled. After these events, the 1,000 members of the Serbian Solidarity Fund and Ljubiša Savić created the unit with the name Serbian National Guard of the SAO of Semberija and Majevica, outside of the Motel Obrijež near Bijeljina.

Despite being officially known as a Light Infantry Brigade due to terminology derived from the Yugoslav People's Army, a notable aspect of the guard was its extensive use of various improvised armoured vehicles (Referred to as the 'Iron Battalion'). The creation of the vehicles was overseen by guard member Captain Mišel Ostojić. The unit also had a small aviation detachment, utilising the Antonov AN-2 and UTVA-75 for observation purposes.

=== Wartime ===
The unit participated in many operations, namely Operation Corridor and the capture of Tinja and Smoluća. Other engagements included Zvornik, Brčko, Majevica, Posavina, Bratunac, Ozren, Sarajevo, Kupres and Bihać.

The unit was famous, receiving volunteers from neighbouring Montenegro. In total, the unit suffered 106 dead and around 750 wounded fighters, with the most notable loss being of commander Branko "Panter" Pantelić, who was killed in an ambush while fighting in Majevica on September 4, 1992.

In 1993, turbo-folk singer Roki Vulović released an album titled Panteri, commemorating the achievements of the unit, including tracks such as "Panteri", "Mauzer" and "Panteru za sjećanje".

In 1994, the 1st Krajina Corps of the Army of Republika Srpska, along with the Garda Panteri, launched an offensive in Bosanska Krajina, named Operation Breza '94, with the objective being to break the 5th Corps and to take control of the region. The offensive failed, and ended with 20 square kilometers previously held by the Serbs was captured by the ARBiH. 80 Serbs were killed in the battle while another 10 were captured. Other commanders were Ljubisa "Mauzer" Savic and Ljubisa "Ljuti" Lazic.

== See also ==
- Bosnian War
- Army of Republika Srpska
- Ljubiša Savić
