= Ljubiša Savić =

Bosnian Serb military officer (1958–2000)

Major Ljubiša Savić Љубиша Савић
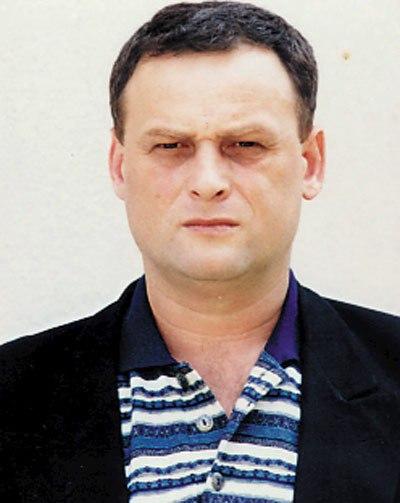
- Ljubiša Savić in 1997
- Born: 11 August 1958; Bijeljina, FPR Yugoslavia
- Died: 7 June 2000 (aged 41); Bijeljina, Republika Srpska, Bosnia and Herzegovina
- Cause of death: Assassination
- Burial place: Kovačići
- Spouse: Bojana Savić
- Children: 2
- Military career
- Allegiance: Republika Srpska
- Branch: Army of Republika Srpska (1992–1996)
- Service years: 1992–1996
- Rank: Major
- Nicknames: "Mauzer"; "Ljubo"
- Unit: Garda Panteri
- Conflicts: Bosnian War; Majevica campaign; Operation Corridor 92; Operation Cerska '93; Operation Sadejstvo; Operation Lukavac '93; Operation Brana 94; Operation "Breza '94"; Operation Autumn '94; Operation Shield '94; Assault on Majevica
- Awards: Order of Nemanjići Order of Karađorđe's Star

Ljubiša "Mauzer" Savić (Serbian Cyrillic: Љубиша Маузер Савић; 11 August 1958 – 7 June 2000) was a Bosnian Serb military commander and officer during the Bosnian War and a post-war politician. He led the Panthers Guard Special Brigade which was one of the most elite units of the Army of Republika Srpska during the war.

After the war, he became the chief of police in Bijeljina. He was assassinated in Bijeljina in 2000, due to suspected gang violence in the city after three gunmen reportedly fired upon his jeep. The first attempt on Savić's life happened in July 1998. Two former Republika Srpska soldiers, Stojan Maksimović and Vladimir Neretljak, were killed in an explosion outside his house. Savić accused Momčilo Krajišnik, the then leader of the SDS, and pro-Belgrade elements in the entity's security services of attempting to plant a bomb under his car. He had been involved in anti-corruption campaigns, and had arrested many corrupt people, even supporters of Radovan Karadžić, including Joja Tintor. The Garda Panteri had also been known to have busted smugglers during the Bosnian War that were controlled by both the SDS, as well as the Republika Srpska government.

== Life ==
Born in Bijeljina in 1958, Ljubiša Savić lived with his wife and children in an apartment at the Social Work Center, where he was employed as a social worker. When the Bosnian War broke out in 1992, he was a member of the Serb Democratic Party.

Savić commanded the Garda Panteri (Serbian Cyrillic: Гарда Пантери), which was later incorporated as a special unit in the armed forces of the Republika Srpska. The unit, initially called the "Serbian National Guard of SAO Semberija and Majevica," was renamed to the "Garda Panteri" by Savić in honor of the commander preceding him, Branko Pantelić, who was killed in action in September 1992. The Garda Panteri, along with the Serb Volunteer Guard commanded by Željko Ražnatović, attempted to capture the city in the spring of 1992. After the Serb capture of Bijeljina, his unit was present but did not participate during Bijeljina massacre, in which 48 to 78 civilians were killed. Savić's unit also broke through the sieges of several smaller towns. During the war, conflict developed between Savić and his counterparts in the Serb Democratic Party (SDS). On several occasions, his unit halted convoys of stolen goods travelling through Republika Srpska and confiscated the contents. The convoys had been under the control of the SDS and Republika Srpska state security. By the end of the war, his rivalry with SDS leadership had grown even more overt; in 1995, he spoke against Hague-detainee SDS leader Momčilo Krajišnik, saying "I contracted diabetes fighting at the front and now I have to watch the authorities get rich on the backs of the poverty of their own people." He left the SDS to form his own political party, the Democratic Party of Republika Srpska, and was elected to parliament. During this time, he aligned himself with the then-president of Republika Srpska, Biljana Plavšić, who had also left the SDS to start an anti-corruption campaign.

The following year, Savić was appointed a police chief in Bijeljina by Milorad Dodik. As part of his anti-corruption campaign in Republika Srpska, he ordered the arrest of several high-ranking government officials, including sympathizers of Radovan Karadžić. Joja Tintor, Karadžić's former adviser, was arrested by Savić in the spring of 1998, but was ordered by his superiors to release Tintor within twenty-four hours of his arrest, despite the burden of proof. Savić responded to this request, but continued his efforts against corruption.

After that, Savić was the victim of repeated assassination attempts. In July 1998, he narrowly escaped death by a bomb placed under his car. In this assassination, however, two of his former comrades died. After the attempted capture of Milovan Bjelica, a close friend of Savić, Srđan Knežević, was shot dead outside his home in Pale. After this attack, a special police unit was created, which Savić was a member of. Shortly after the assassination, he arrested seven suspects, once again including Karadžić sympathizers. However, following torture allegations, he was prohibited from doing any further police work, and released the suspects. As a result, Savić went further into isolation and was only able to protect his former comrades of the Garda Panteri.

== Death ==
Savić was assassinated in his vehicle near a railway station on 7 June 2000, when he stopped briefly to escort an elderly woman home. According to eyewitness reports, another vehicle suddenly appeared, from which Đorđe Ždrale, who had already been convicted of murder and unofficially released, opened fire with an automatic firearm. Savić was hit by six of the thirteen bullets fired and was killed instantly. It is believed that he fell victim to organized gang crime. Six months before his death he stated, "When I embarked on all this, I said goodbye to my life."

His death was preceded by several months of constant observation and analysis of his way of life by Ždrale, who, together with two unknown persons, prepared the assassination. He acquired weapons, ammunition, a vehicle, clothing and radios. It was not until 2010 that he was convicted, as his clearance was not registered in the files, and he therefore had an alibi.

Savić was buried in his home village Kovačići near Bijeljina in the circle of his family, friends and former comrades.
