= Majevica front (1992–1995) =

Campaign of the Bosnian War

- Part of the Bosnian War
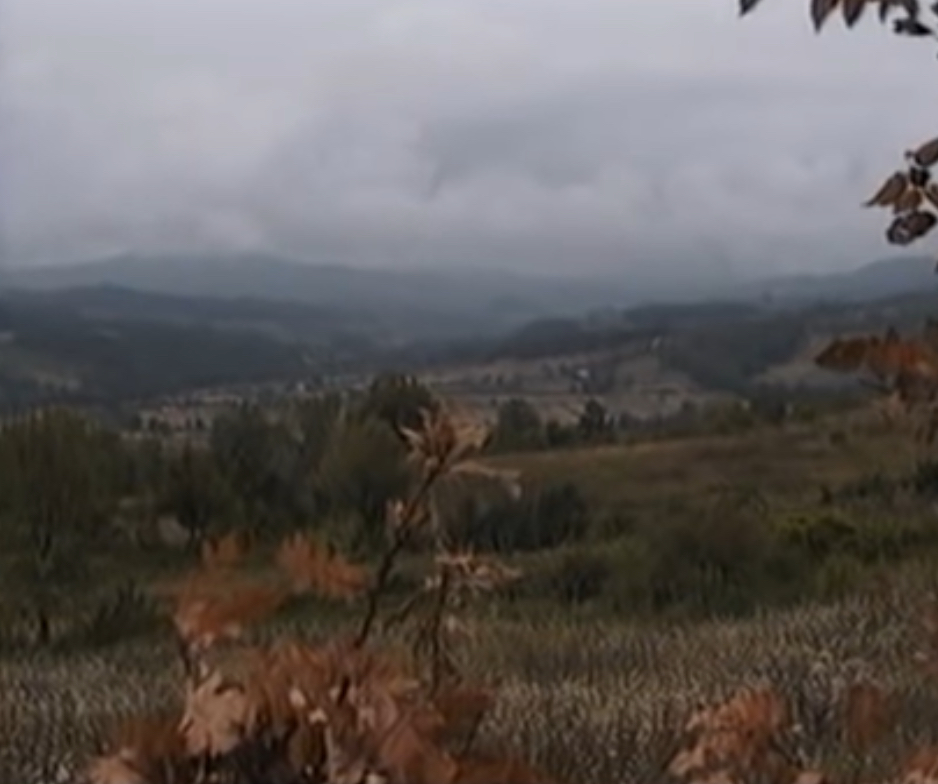
- Majevica frontlines in 1995.
Date	1992–1995
Location	Majevica and surrounding areas
Result	Serbian victory: Bosniak offensive on Majevica repulsed; Dayton Agreement ends all fighting on Majevica

Belligerents
Republika Srpska	(Republic of Bosnia and Herzegovina) Bosnia and Herzegovina; NATO; Herzeg-Bosnia (1992–1994)

Commanders and leaders
Ratko Mladić; Momir Zec; Branko Pantelić †; Ljubiša Savić; Boško Perić †	Željko Knez; Hazim Šadić

Units involved
Army of Republika Srpska; East Bosnia Corps; Garda Panteri	Army of Republic of Bosnia and Herzegovina; 2nd Corps; 3rd Corps; Croatian Defence Council; 115th HVO "Zrinski" brigade (Until 1994)

Casualties and losses
Heavy	Heavy

The Majevica front (1992–1995) was one of the main campaigns during the Bosnian War with intense clashes occurring on a regular basis, the situation stayed 50/50 on the hills (and the surrounding areas) until the 1995 Dayton Agreement. The Bosnian Serbs and the Bosnians wanted to control Majevica, as it had a radio tower vital for: communication, television, telephone communication's and node radio, as this would help supply and help the Bosnian Serb army. Holding part of the mountain held a great advantage for both sides, as the Bosnians and Serbs could threaten their territories in North-Western Bosnia. During the fighting, NATO bombed Bosnian Serb positions in Majevica.

== Background ==
As the Yugoslav People's Army (Jugoslovenska narodna armija – JNA) withdrew from Croatia following the acceptance and start of implementation of the Vance plan, its 55,000 officers and soldiers born in Bosnia and Herzegovina were transferred to a new Bosnian Serb army, which was later renamed the Army of Republika Srpska (Vojska Republike Srpske – VRS). This reorganisation followed the declaration of the Serbian Republic of Bosnia and Herzegovina on 9 January 1992, ahead of the 29 February – 1 March 1992 referendum on the independence of Bosnia and Herzegovina. This declaration would later be cited by the Bosnian Serbs as a pretext for the Bosnian War. Clashes began in Early 1992, as tensions arose between Serbs and Bosniaks in the Majevica and Semberija region. The 1992 Yugoslav People's Army column incident in Tuzla culminated in the bloody skirmishes in Bosnia and Majevica.

== Timeline ==
=== 1992 ===
Clashes between Serbs and Bosniak forces occurred in 1992, with a large offensive being launched by the ARBiH in September.

==== Teočak and Priboj offensive ====
In September 1992, the ARBiH would launch an offensive on Teočak and Priboj, a defensive line is set up by the Garda Panteri.

In the same period of the offensive, the ARBiH conducted attacks on villages on Majevica, eventually penetrating into the Tuzla-Bijeljina roads. 1st in command of the Panther Guard, Branko Pantelić was killed in action during combat against the ARBiH. A counteroffensive was launched by the VRS and drove the ARBiH back to their positions.

=== 1993 ===
==== Battle of Banj Brdo ====
On April 20–21, 1993 Elite Bosnian units would penetrate the Banj Brdo Hills outer defense lines, with the goal of surprising attacking the VRS defenses at the rear. The ARBiH units would then occupy the Slopes. A VRS counterattack was then underway a half hour later, the VRS Drove the ARBiH from the occupied slopes and capturing further land. In the same period, a Clash during Easter occurred, ending in Serbian victory.

=== 1994 ===
In 1994, the ARBiH would attack the strategic radio tower on Mount Majevica, also attempting pushing the Serbs so that they could not shell Tuzla. The attack consisted of multiple Groups and Corps. The Bosnian-Serbs deployed many units to counter-attack Bosnian forces. The ARBiH occupied “Sapna thumb”, then defending the East and north of the Radio stolice, where the 1st Majevica Brigade was garrisoned. The rest of the units were stationed around the radio stolice. The ARBiH had 8,000 troops, compared to the approximate 7,000 Bosnian-Serb troops.

The Bosnian Serb army would occasionally shell the slopes of Majevica, and small clashes. But the ARBiH began to grow its forces in the region.

==== Attack on Stolice ====
In April Bosnian Forces attacked the Bosnian Serb army on may 11. The 2nd Corps would carry out repeated attacks on Mt. Majevica and on Banjbrdo. The 206th Mesic Brigade would see the intense fighting. The Bosnian Serb army shelled Bosnian towns and villages and began a counterattack. Bosnian forces shelled the Radio stolice, dismantling Serbian communications and TV temporarily, but failed to capture the radio tower. The Bosnian offensive had been halted to temporarily regroup and reinforce their troops. The Bosnian assault continued on May 27 attacking their previous objectives, a Bosnian Serb unit counterattacked and pushed Bosnian forces several kilometers south.

The June cease-fire saw the Bosnian Serbs drive the government gains in Majevica.

Battle of Lisači

In November, the ARBiH launched an offensive against the VRS, with the goal of taking a radio tower, the ARBiH launched their attack in November, prior to this some Bosnian soldiers snuck behind Serbian lines to test where the Serbs were the most vulnerable. The ARBiH liberated; Mala Jelica, Lisača, and Senokos. Lisača had not been fully encircled so the ARBiH waited for the surrounded VRS members. The Bosnians and Serbs negotiated on May 11, Vesko Mitrović (commanding the VRS soldiers) dictated that he would withdraw his forces from Mala Jelica, the ARBiH demanded the VRS withdrew from Kolijevka and Mala Jelica. Vesko stated that he would talk about it with his superiors, however a Serbian counterattack was already underway. Helicopters were sent to give the surrounded VRS soldiers bread, but heavy gunfire from the ARBiH limited the number of supplies. A number of VRS attacks were launched against the ARBiH enclave, the main attack from the VRS had been stopped by the ARBiH. A series of other attacks were launched by the VRS but all failed. The Serbs lost 1 commander, Boško Perić, killed in an attempt to evacuate the surrounded soldiers. Another Serb commander was wounded. Although the main goal of capturing the relay tower failed for the ARBiH, they managed to gain a few kilometers of land.

=== 1995 ===
The fighting on Majevica in 1995 was some of the fiercest since 1994 and 1993, Under-seeing many Offensives and counterattacks.

==== Majevica Offensive ====
The ARBiH launch a major offensive to capture repeater towers. The ARBiH suffered abysmal losses and was forced to retreat due to the treacherous weather conditions. The ARBiH and Army of Republika Srpska both shelled each other.

The ARBiH relaunch the offensive on March 23, the ARBiH pushed the Serbs back and captured the repeater tower, both sides suffered heavy losses fighting for the repeater towers. The Bosnian Serbs shelled the positions heavily for 2 days, which eventually led Radovan Karadzic to order a counteroffensive on the ARBiH. The Garda Panteri and other units broke through the enclave of the ARBiH position and set a corridor that led to the repeater towers. The ARBiH defense collapsed, due to the weather conditions and the fierce fighting. The ARBiH unit that attacked the repeater tower shifted its attacks to villages near Lukavac, but the ARBiH failed to gain any significant ground. The ARBiH re-attempted to capture the Repeater tower, but failed to capture it. The Serbs launched a counterattack and re-took the repeater tower.

== Aftermath ==
=== Infrastructural and economic damage ===
Intense Battles and clashes took place in Majevica, resulting in infrastructural and environmental damage. The economic situation in the area also deteriorated. After the 1995 Dayton Peace Agreement, the Mayors near Majevica planned to make economic and Infrastructural reforms, as well as boosting tourism.
