= Bilalići =

- Village
- Location within Bosnia and Herzegovina
- Coordinates: 44.6122°N 19.0097°E
- Country: Bosnia and Herzegovina
- Entity: Federation of Bosnia and Herzegovina
- Canton: Tuzla
- Municipality: Teočak

Area
  - Total: 1.83 sq mi (4.73 km^{2})

Population (2013)
  - Total: 997
  - Density: 546/sq mi (211/km^{2})
- Time zone: UTC+1 (CET)
  - Summer (DST): UTC+2 (CEST)

Bilalići is a village in the municipality of Teočak, Bosnia and Herzegovina.

== Demographics ==
According to the 2013 census, its population was 997, all Bosniaks.
