= Rožanj, Sapna =

Rožanj
- Village
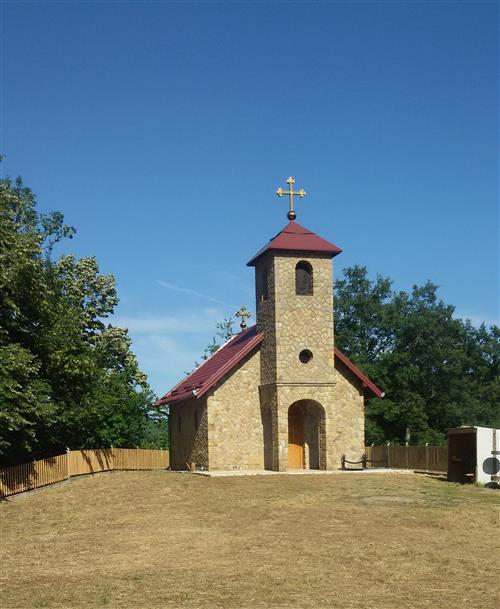

- Location within Bosnia and Herzegovina
- Coordinates: 44.535246°N 18.928784°E
- Country: Bosnia and Herzegovina
- Entity: Federation of Bosnia and Herzegovina
- Canton: {Tuzla
- Municipality: Sapna

Area
  - Total: 5.77 sq mi (14.94 km^{2})

Population (2013)
  - Total: 22
  - Density: 3.8/sq mi (1.5/km^{2})

Rožanj is a village in the municipality of Sapna, Bosnia and Herzegovina.

== Demographics ==
According to the 2013 census, its population was 22.

Ethnicity in 2013
Ethnicity	Number	Percentage
Bosniaks	16	72.7%
Serbs	6	27.3%
Total	22	100%
