= Tursunovo Brdo =

- Village
- Location within Bosnia and Herzegovina
- Coordinates: 44.6034°N 19.0358°E
- Country: Bosnia and Herzegovina
- Entity: Federation of Bosnia and Herzegovina
- Region Canton: Bijeljina; Tuzla
- Municipality: Ugljevik; Teočak

Area
  - Total: 2.36 sq mi (6.10 km^{2})

Population (2013)
  - Total: 215
  - Density: 91.3/sq mi (35.2/km^{2})
- Time zone: UTC+1 (CET)
  - Summer (DST): UTC+2 (CEST)

Tursunovo Brdo is a village in the municipalities of Ugljevik (Republika Srpska) and Teočak, Bosnia and Herzegovina.

== Demographics ==
According to the 2013 census, its population was 215, all Bosniaks living in the Teočak part, thus none in the Ugljevik part.
