= Nezuk =

- Village
- Location within Bosnia and Herzegovina
- Coordinates: 44.4664974°N 18.9824867°E
- Country: Bosnia and Herzegovina
- Entity: Federation of Bosnia and Herzegovina
- Canton: Tuzla
- Municipality: Sapna

Area
  - Total: 2.03 sq mi (5.25 km^{2})

Population (2013)
  - Total: 1,022
  - Density: 504/sq mi (195/km^{2})

Nezuk is a village in the municipality of Sapna, Bosnia and Herzegovina.

== History ==
Prior to the Bosnian War, the village, like all other settlements in Sapna, belonged to the Zvornik municipality.

The Bosniak commander Hajrudin Mešić was killed in action in Nezuk on October 30, 1992 while attempting to create a corridor through Srebrenica.

== Demographics ==
According to the 2013 census, its population was 1,022.

Ethnicity in 2013
Ethnicity	Number	Percentage
Bosniaks	1,012	99.0%
Serbs	5	0.5%
other/undeclared	5	0.5%
Total	1,022	100%
