= Međeđa =

Međeđa may refer to the following places in Bosnia and Herzegovina:

- Međeđa (Kozarska Dubica)
- Međeđa, Sapna
- Međeđa (Višegrad)
