= Vulović =

Vulović (Serbian: Вуловић) is a Serbian surname. Notable people with the surname include:

- Aleksa Vulović, Australian comedian and YouTube personality
- Ljubomir Vulović (1876–1917), artillery major in the Serbian Army
- Vesna Vulović (1950–2016), Serbian flight attendant
- Rodoljub Roki Vulović (1955-), Serbs of Bosnia and Herzegovina Serb singer and songwriter

== See also ==
- Vuković
