= 1st Guards Brigade (Army of Republika Srpska) =

1st Guards Motorized Brigade
- Прва гардијска моторизована бригада (Serbian)
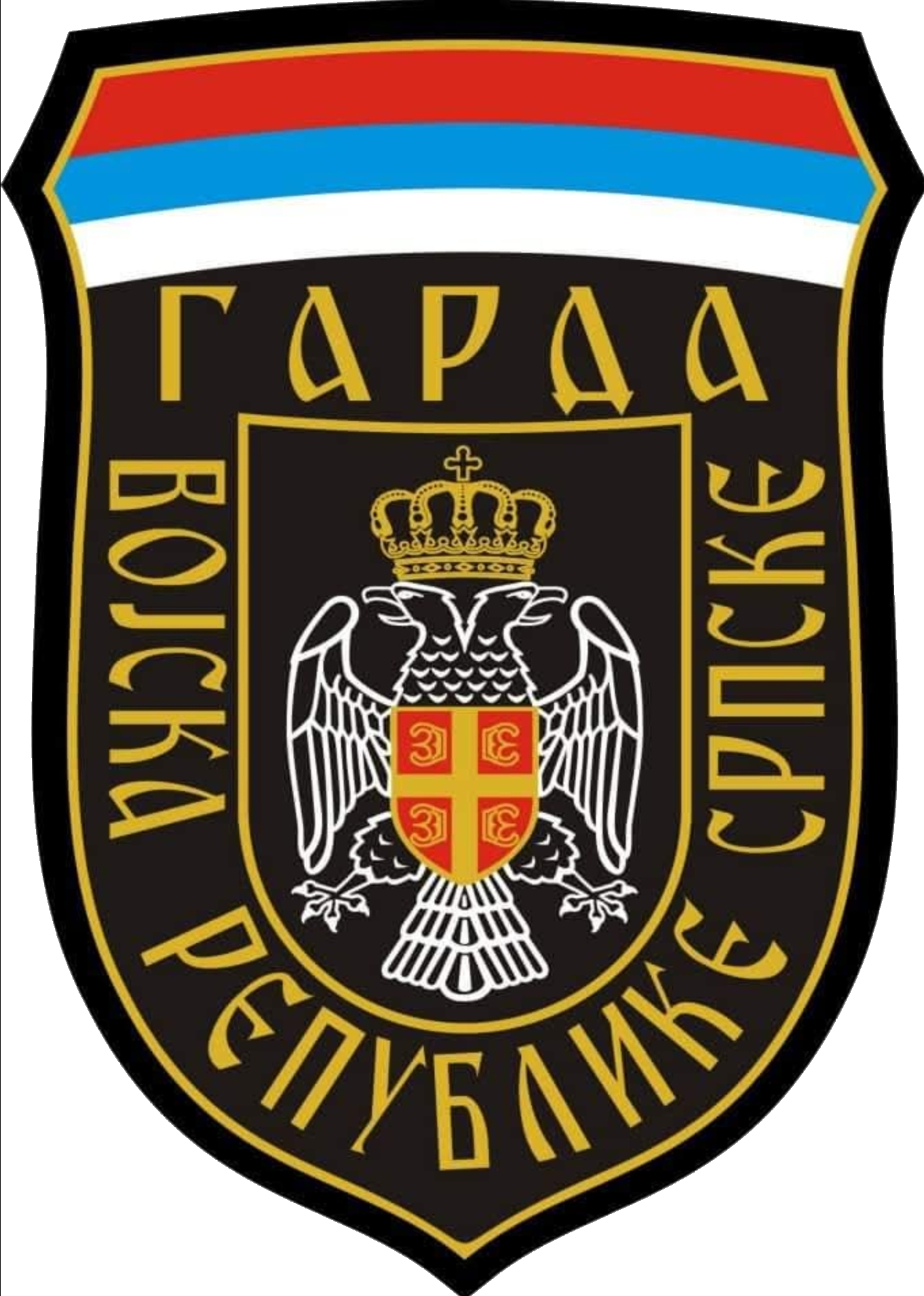
- 1st Guards Brigade Insignia
- Active: 19 January 1993 – 1 April 1997
- Country: Republika Srpska
- Branch: Army of Republika Srpska
- Type: Guard Brigade
- Size: 7,100 (peak); approx. 4,491
- Part of: General Staff of the Army of Republika Srpska
- Garrison/HQ: Han Pijesak, Kalinovik
- Nickname: Sons of Srpska
- Engagements: Bosnian War; Siege of Sarajevo; Siege of Srebrenica; Siege of Žepa; Operation Cerska '93; Operation Lukavac '93; Operation Tekbir '95
- Decorations: Medal of Petar Mrkonjić

Commanders
- Notable commanders: Colonel Tihomir Rajak; Colonel Milenko Lazić; Lt. Colonel Dragan Lalević; Colonel Zdravko Samardžić

The 1st Guards Motorized Brigade of the General Staff of the Army of Republika Srpska (Serbian: Прва гардијска моторизована бригада Генералштаба Војске Републике Српске) was one of the most elite and best-equipped military formations of the Army of Republika Srpska (VRS). Directly subordinated to the General Staff, it served as one of the guard units of the VRS, modeled after similar formations of the former Yugoslav People's Army (JNA) 1st Guards Motorized Brigade based in Belgrade.

== Formation ==
The brigade was created by order of the VRS General Staff in late December 1992 and became operational on 19 January 1993. Its organization was based on the structure of the former JNA 1st Guards Motorized Brigade, a prominent staff guard formation.

Over 7,000 soldiers passed through the unit during the war, drawn from across Republika Srpska. The brigade headquarters was initially located in Han Pijesak and later relocated to Kalinovik.

== Organization ==
According to wartime formation tables, the brigade included:

- Two motorized battalions
- Mixed artillery battalion
- Light air-defense artillery battalion
- Armored battalion
- Logistics battalion
- Staff and support units:
  - Military police company
  - Signals company
  - Reconnaissance company
  - Engineering company
  - Headquarters company

This structure made it one of the more heavily equipped formations under the VRS General Staff.

== Military service ==
Throughout most of the Bosnian War, the brigade was deployed in the wider area of Mount Treskavica and the municipality of Trnovo, operating under the Herzegovina Corps as part of the defensive system protecting the southern approaches to Sarajevo. Its positions in this mountainous sector formed a key link between the Herzegovina and eastern Bosnian fronts, and the unit's deployment there remained largely continuous from 1993 until the end of the conflict.

In early 1993, elements of the brigade took part in several major actions, including Operation Cerska '93 and Operation Lukavac '93, which were aimed at reinforcing contested sectors and halting advances by the Army of the Republic of Bosnia and Herzegovina. These operations marked the brigade's first large-scale engagements after achieving operational readiness, and its units were frequently used to strengthen exposed fronts due to their high degree of mobility and training.

The brigade's heaviest fighting occurred around Trnovo in 1994, where commemorative accounts describe intense engagements on 1 October and 29 October during attempts to break the Herzegovina Corps' defensive line. In these actions, the brigade reportedly suffered significant losses, with 23 members killed, and veterans later characterized the Treskavica–Trnovo front as among the most demanding battlefields of the war.

As the conflict widened in 1995, the brigade was repeatedly redeployed to reinforce threatened sectors. In late 1995, parts of the unit were sent to Bosanska Posavina to stabilize areas temporarily vacated by formations of the 1st Krajina Corps that had been transferred to the Bosanska Krajina front. Units whose positions were reinforced included the 16th Krajina Motorized Brigade, the 43rd Prijedor Motorized Brigade, the 6th Sanska Light Infantry Brigade, and the 5th Kozara Light Infantry Brigade.

== Final operations ==
During the final months of the war, brigade elements also operated in the Glamoč–Bosansko Grahovo sector, supporting defensive efforts to maintain key communication routes amid large-scale offensives by opposing forces. These rapid shifts between fronts reflected the unit's role as a General Staff reserve formation and placed considerable strain on personnel and logistics.

According to veterans' associations and commemorative sources, more than one hundred members of the brigade were killed during the war, although precise figures remain difficult to verify due to limited publicly accessible documentation. Most available numbers derive from memorial registers and post-war veterans' initiatives.

== Post-war legacy ==
After the brigade's disbandment in 1997, veterans and former officers established several initiatives to preserve its history and commemorate fallen members. In 2019, the "Association of Guardsmen of the 1st Guards Motorized Brigade" was founded to collect documentation, maintain memorials, and provide support for former servicemen. Anniversaries of the brigade's formation continue to be marked in Republika Srpska with commemorative gatherings, memorial services, and public events. In 2025, a detailed monograph on the brigade was published, compiling operational reports, archival material, photographs, and testimonies from former members.

== See also ==
- Army of Republika Srpska
- Bosnian War
- Garda Panteri

== Literature ==
- Central Intelligence Agency, Office of Russian and European Analysis (2002). Balkan Battlegrounds: A Military History of the Yugoslav Conflict, 1990–1995, Volume 1. Washington, D.C.: Central Intelligence Agency. ISBN 978-0-16-066472-4.

- Central Intelligence Agency, Office of Russian and European Analysis (2002). Balkan Battlegrounds: a Military History of the Yugoslav conflict, 1990–1995. Vol. 2. Washington, D.C.: Central Intelligence Agency. ISBN 978-0-16-066472-4.
- Bulatović, Ljiljana: Raport Komandantu. Belgrade, 2010.
- Pandurević, Vinko: Serbs in Bosnia and Herzegovina. IGAM, Belgrade, 2012.
