= Gornja Krčina =

Gornja Kurčina
- Village
- Location within Bosnia and Herzegovina
- Coordinates: 44.5947°N 19.0545°E
- Country: Bosnia and Herzegovina
- Entity: Federation of Bosnia and Herzegovina
- Region Canton: Bijeljina; Tuzla
- Municipality: Ugljevik; Teočak

Area
  - Total: 2.00 sq mi (5.18 km^{2})

Population (2013)
  - Total: 168
  - Density: 84.0/sq mi (32.4/km^{2})
- Time zone: UTC+1 (CET)
  - Summer (DST): UTC+2 (CEST)

Gornja Kurčina is a village in the municipalities of Ugljevik (Republika Srpska) and Teočak, Bosnia and Herzegovina.

== Demographics ==
According to the 2013 census, its population was 168, all Serbs living in the Ugljevik part, thus none in the Teočak part.
