= Attack on Stolice =

Attack on Stolice in 1994
- Part of the War in Bosnia
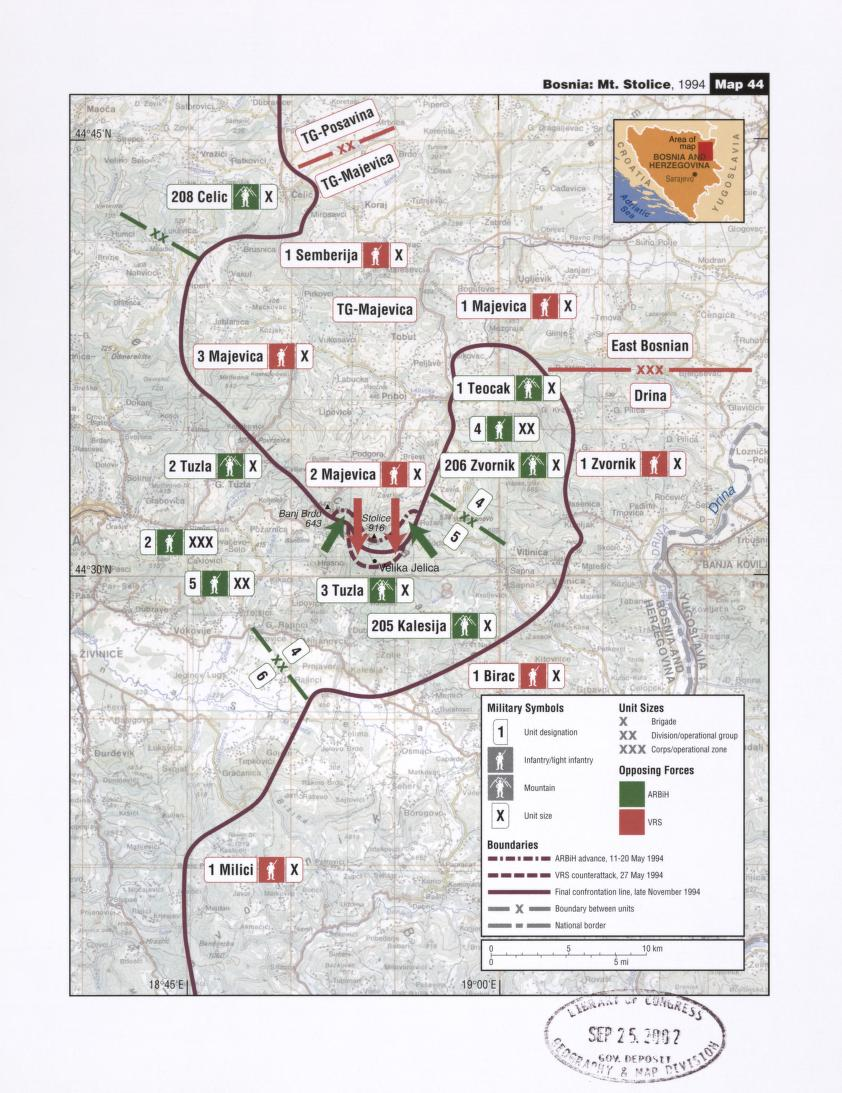
- Army of Republika Srpska counteroffensive
Date	11 – 27 May 1994
Location	Stolice, Majevica, BiH

Belligerents
Republika Srpska	Bosnia and Herzegovina

Commanders and leaders
Unknown	Unknown

Units involved
Army of Republika Srpska	Army of the Republic of Bosnia and Herzegovina

Casualties and losses
Unknown	Unknown

The attack on Stolice was an attempt by the Army of the Republic of Bosnia and Herzegovina (ARBiH) to control the positions of the Army of Republika Srpska (VRS) on Mountain Majevica in 1994. At first, the ARBiH suppressed the VRS, and a week later, the ARBiH attacked the VRS positions again. The VRS retaliated with a counterattack up to the top of Mountain Jelica and returned part of the southern territory. The defense of Stolice and Banj brdo was carried out by the East Bosnian Corps of the Army of Republika Srpska.

== Battle ==
At the beginning of 1994, the Army of the Republic of Bosnia and Herzegovina (ARBiH) launched intensified attacks against positions held by the Army of Republika Srpska (VRS) on Mount Majevica. In April, ARBiH forces prepared an assault on the strategic Stolice peak. The main attack began on May 11, with the Teočak Brigade and the "Hajrudin Mesić" unit capturing Banj brdo.

The heaviest fighting took place on May 14 and 15 during ongoing ARBiH offensives. On May 15 and 16, VRS units launched a counter-offensive, pushing back ARBiH troops from their positions and causing significant losses. ARBiH failed to seize the Stolice communication relay station, although they damaged it, briefly disrupting broadcasts in the area.

The offensive paused on May 20. A week later, a renewed push toward Banj Brdo and Stolice occurred, but VRS Tactical Group Majevica repelled the advance, pursued ARBiH units to Velika Jelica, and regained southern territory lost in April and May.
