= Jasenje, Teočak =

Jasenje
- Village
- Location within Bosnia and Herzegovina
- Coordinates: 44.6204°N 18.9972°E
- Country: Bosnia and Herzegovina
- Entity: Federation of Bosnia and Herzegovina
- Region Canton: Bijeljina; Tuzla
- Municipality: Ugljevik; Teočak

Area
  - Total: 0.78 sq mi (2.02 km^{2})

Population (2013)
  - Total: 18
  - Density: 23/sq mi (8.9/km^{2})
- Time zone: UTC+1 (CET)
  - Summer (DST): UTC+2 (CEST)

Jasenje is a village in the municipalities of Ugljevik (Republika Srpska) and Teočak, Bosnia and Herzegovina.

== Demographics ==
According to the 2013 census, its population was 18, all Bosniaks living in the Teočak part, thus none in the Ugljevik part,
