= Hajrudin Mešić =

Bosnian military commander (1959–1992)

- Born: 1 January 1959; Srednja Trnova, Ugljevik, PR Bosnia and Herzegovina, FPR Yugoslavia
- Died: 30 October 1992 (aged 33); Nezuk, Sapna, Republic of Bosnia and Herzegovina
- Spouse: Radenka
- Children: 2
- Military career
- Allegiance: (Socialist Federal Republic of Yugoslavia) SFR Yugoslavia Republic of Bosnia and Herzegovina
- Branch: Army of the Republic of Bosnia and Herzegovina
- Service years: 1984–92
- Nicknames: Kapetan Hajro (Captain Hajro); The Dragon of Majevica (Zmaj od Majevice)
- Commands: 255. Glorious Mountain Brigade "Hajrudin Mešić"
- Conflicts: Bosnian War; Teočak and Priboj offensive; Kalesija and Kamenica offensive †
- Awards: Order of the Golden Lily Order of the Hero of the Liberation War Golden Police Badge

Hajrudin Mešić aka Kapetan Hajro (January 1, 1959 – October 30, 1992) was a Bosnian military commander and brigadier general in the Army of the Republic of Bosnia and Herzegovina during the Bosnian War.

== Early life ==
Hajrudin Mešić was born on New Year's Day 1959 in the village of Srednja Trnova, municipality of Ugljevik. In the Mešić family, in addition to father Meho and mother Zejfa, Hajrudin had a brother and two sisters. He completed eight-year school in Srednja and Donja Trnova. After finishing elementary school, he attended and graduated from the JNA non-commissioned officer school in Sarajevo. During his service in the JNA, he graduated part-time from the JNA military academy in Belgrade and received the rank of captain.

== War period ==
The war in the territory of the former Yugoslavia found him in the rank of captain, in the service of the JNA in Karlovac, Croatia. In 1991 he left the JNA and Croatia, bringing his family back to Ugljevik. There, he was named the commander of the Ugljevik militia station. In the Teočak area, he spearheaded the creation of patriotic forces with a smaller faction. At the start of the war, he decided to leave the region because he was the commander of the Ugljevik Militia Station and refused to swear loyalty to the newly formed Serbian municipal government. With a group of like-minded people, he moved to Teocak, where he became the commander of the Territorial Defense of Teočak. On September 16, 1992, with the formation of the 1st Teočan, later the 255th famous mountain brigade, he became its commander.

== Death ==
He died on October 30, 1992, in the village of Nezuk, while trying to break through the corridor towards the besieged Kamenica. After this, the 1st Teočak Brigade was renamed the Hajrudin Mešić Brigade.

== Legacy ==
Captain Mešić is survived by his wife Radenka, and their daughter Lejla, and son Zlatko.

A street in Simin Han near Tuzla is named after him (Bosnian: Ulica Hajrudina Mešića), in Kalesija (Ulica Kapetana Hajrudina Mešića - Hajre), and in Sokolović Kolonija neighborhood in the municipality of Ilidža in Sarajevo, as well (Ulica Kapetana Hajre Mešića).

== Awards ==
He received the highest war awards: the Order of the Golden Lily and the Golden Police Badge. In addition, he was posthumously promoted to the rank of brigadier general, and awarded the Order of the Hero of the Liberation War of the Army of the Republic of Bosnia and Herzegovina.
