= Stari Teočak =

- Village
- Location within Bosnia and Herzegovina
- Coordinates: 44.6017°N 19.0085°E
- Country: Bosnia and Herzegovina
- Entity: Federation of Bosnia and Herzegovina
- Canton: Tuzla
- Municipality: Teočak

Area
  - Total: 1.12 sq mi (2.89 km^{2})

Population (2013)
  - Total: 797
  - Density: 714/sq mi (276/km^{2})
- Time zone: UTC+1 (CET)
  - Summer (DST): UTC+2 (CEST)

Stari Teočak is a village in the municipality of Teočak, Bosnia and Herzegovina.

== Demographics ==
According to the 2013 census, its population was 797, all Bosniaks.
