= Suvada Selimović =

Bosnian activist and pacifist (born 1965)

- Born: 1965 (age 60–61); Vitinica, Sapna, Socialist Republic of Bosnia and Herzegovina, Socialist Federal Republic of Yugoslavia
- Occupations: Activist and pacifist
- Children: 3

Suvada Selimović (born 1965) is a Bosnian activist and pacifist, who works to promote mutual aid between women and for those responsible for the crimes of the Bosnian War to be brought to justice.

== Biography ==
Selimović was born in 1965 in the village of Vitinica, Sapna, part of the Socialist Republic of Bosnia and Herzegovina a federated state of the Socialist Federal Republic of Yugoslavia.

During the war in Bosnia and Herzegovina (1992–1995), on 1 June 1992 Selimović, her husband Hasan and their three young children were expelled from the village of Đulića, where they lived, as they were members of the Bosniak ethnic group. Her husband, along with other male members of her family, were separated from the column in which they were moving. She recalled that: "they separated my husband, his father, and his four brothers, and his oldest brother's two sons who were not even of age. The same was true of other neighbors and family." She later discovered that he had been killed by a firing squad in Karakaj, near Zvornik. His remains were found in a mass grave of 700 men in 2008.

Selimović and the children were sent to Tuzla, a territory controlled by Bosnian Muslims, where they were given shelter in an abandoned military barracks. She then spent the war with her children in Đakovo in Croatia and Ajdovščina in Slovenia as refugees. After the signing of the Dayton Peace Agreement in 1995, Selimović returned to her home village. Selimović has since helped to rebuild her pre-war home, testified before the Special Court for War Crimes in Belgrade, Serbia, in 2005 and testified to denounce war crimes at the "Women's Court" in Sarajevo, Bosnia and Herzegovina, in 2015.

Selimović also founded the Association for the Empowerment of Women (Anima), an organisation for peace activism and women's empowerment, through which she works to promote mutual aid between women, encourages other women to speak out and campaigns for those responsible for the crimes of the Bosnian War to be brought to justice.

Selimović was named a BBC 100 Woman in 2022. She has spoken at events such as the Grounded Festival in Slovenia and at a public lecture by the Humanitarian Law Center in Serbia.

== See also ==
- List of peace activists
