= Kalesija and Kamenica fighting (July – October 1992) =

- Part of the Bosnian War
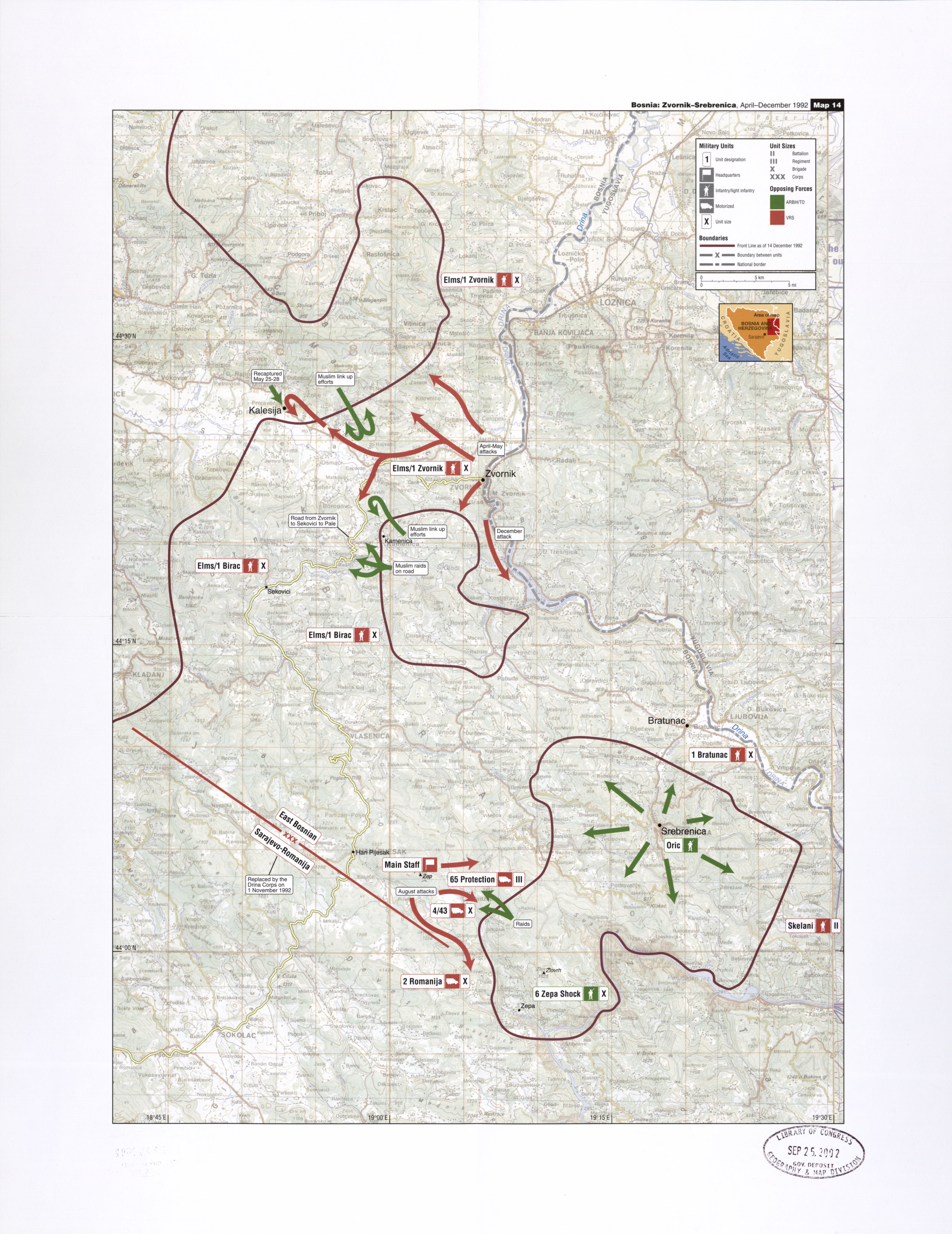
Date	29 July — 30 October 1992
Location	Kalesija and Kamenica, Bosnia and Herzegovina
Result	ARBiH fails to capture and hold the Zvornik-Šekovići road; ARBiH fails to link Cerska-Kamenica pocket with other Republic of Bosnia and Herzegovina-held territory; VRS reduces the size of the Cerska-Kamenica pocket slightly

Belligerents
Republika Srpska	Republic of Bosnia and Herzegovina

Commanders and leaders
	Hajrudin Mešić †

Units involved
Army of Republika Srpska: 1st Birač Infantry Brigade; 1st Zvornik Infantry Brigade	Army of the Republic of Bosnia and Herzegovina: Tuzla Territorial Defence

Strength
7,000–8,000	12,000–14,000 (no more than half had weapons)

Casualties and losses
Unknown	Unknown

Fighting occurred in the Kalesija and Kamenica area near Tuzla in northeastern Bosnia and Herzegovina between the Army of Republika Srpska (VRS) and the Army of the Republic of Bosnia and Herzegovina (ARBiH) during the period 29 July – 30 October 1992 during the Bosnian War. Attempts by the ARBiH to capture and hold the Zvornik–Šekovići road were unsuccessful, as were their attempts to link the Cerska-Kamenica enclave to other ARBiH-held territory. The VRS achieved a minor success in reducing the size of the enclave. The enclave was linked to ARBiH-held territory at the end of 1992.

== Background ==
Following the capture of the town of Zvornik by Bosnian Serb Territorial Defense (TO) elements in April 1992, they sought to expand their control of the area around the town and link the areas they now held with those around the towns of Šekovići and Vlasenica to the southwest. The intent was to connect the northeastern parts of Republika Srpska and the Serb-dominated rump Federal Republic of Yugoslavia with the Bosnian Serb-controlled area around Sarajevo. As part of offensive operations aimed at achieving this objective, on 11 May Bosnian Serb TO and Yugoslav People's Army (JNA) troops captured the key population centre of Kalesija, 20 km (12 mi) west of Zvornik. This and other operational successes gave the Bosnian Serbs were able to secure the use of the road between Zvornik and Šekovići, which was the sole route to access the Bosnian Serb capital of Pale from the northeast. Bosnian TO elements recaptured Kalesija between 25 and 28 May, but the road remained in Bosnian Serb hands.

In late May and June, both sides reorganised their forces, with remaining JNA troops in the region being amalgamated into the Army of Republika Srpska (VRS) alongside Bosnian Serb TO elements and volunteer units after the VRS was created on 20 May. In the area around Zvornik and Šekovići, the VRS troops were organised into two brigades under the command of the East Bosnian Corps. The first of these was the 1st Zvornik Infantry Brigade, of about 3,500 troops. Half of that brigade was positioned facing northwest opposing Bosnian TO elements around the towns of Sapna and Kalesija, and the other half was facing south or southeast towards the small towns of Cerska and Kamenica, and responsible for securing the Zvornik–Šekovići road. The second brigade – the 1st Birač Infantry Brigade – was headquartered in Šekovići and had between 3,000 and 4,000 troops. It also had two frontlines to maintain: the area around Kalesija and Kladanj; and the area around Cerska and Kamenica. There were another 500 VRS troops in the area, comprising the special operations battalion known as the "Drina Wolves" and an Interior Ministry (MUP) special police detachment.

The Bosnian TO also underwent a reorganisation, although weapons remained scarce, and no more than half of the troops were armed. Despite this limitation, the Bosnian TO in the region were able to form highly effective sabotage units. The Tuzla TO District thus fielded between 8,000 and 10,000 men formed into brigades as follows:

- the Živinice brigade in the Sapna salient southeast of Tuzla;
- the Kalesija brigade between Kalesija and Sapna;
- the Zvornik brigade between Sapna and Teočak; and
- the Teočak brigade at the tip of the Sapna salient.

The Bosnian TO also formed two additional brigades within the Cerska-Kamenica pocket, with perhaps another 4,000 men, but no more than half of them were armed.

Despite the reverses suffered in May by the Bosnian TO in the region, both those elements in the Kalesija and Sapna area and within the Cerska-Kamenica enclave continued to fight, and made several attempts to capture the Zvornik–Šekovići road. Around 7 June, the Bosnian TO elements from Kalesija and Sapna attacked the VRS 1st Zvornik Infantry Brigade positions, aiming to reach the important villages of Memići and Caparde on the Zvornik–Šekovići road. The next month saw the fighting move backwards and forwards over this area, but the VRS eventually gain the advantage. On 19 June, the 1st Birač Infantry Brigade captured the key height of Mount Vis, which overlooked Kalesija, the Spreča River valley, and even the Tuzla-Dubrave airbase. After the 1st Zvornik Infantry Brigade retook Memići on 9 July, the fighting petered out.

== Attacks ==
After the inconclusive operations in May and early July, Bosnian TO elements mainly from the Cerska–Kamenica enclave went on the offensive with a further series of raids and attacks aimed at severing the Zvornik-Šekovići road. The first was launched on 29 and 30 July. In this operation, Army of the Republic of Bosnia and Herzegovina (ARBiH) troops from the Kalesija and Sapna area made holding attacks while sabotage units assaulted towards the road near Crni Vrh mountain, where there was a critical bottleneck some 10 km (6.2 mi) northeast of Šekovići and 4 km (2.5 mi) west of the ARBiH-held Cerska-Kamenica pocket. The opposing VRS troops fought back and reopened the road. In late August ARBiH units from Kalesija and Kamenica attacked towards the road from both sides in an attempt to link up, but gained little ground. The following month, sabotage units struck the route twice, but were repelled by the defenders. October saw a major effort by the ARBIH to link Kalesija with the Cerska-Kamenica enclave, and at the same time the VRS 1st Zvornik and 1st Birac Infantry Brigades tried to shrink the enclave. Despite some minor VRS successes, neither side achieved overall success in their aims. During one of the last ARBiH attacks on 30 October, the veteran commander of the Teočak brigade, Hajrudin Mešić, was killed.

== Aftermath ==
Undaunted, the ARBiH attacked and severed the Zvornik-Šekovići road on three occasions in November. In turn, the VRS 1st Zvornik Brigade attacked and captured the Zvornik–Drinjača–Bratunac road between the Cerska-Kamenica enclave and the Drina River on 22 December. However, around New Year 1993 ARBiH elements from Srebrenica gained control of this road and linked the enclave to Srebrenica and Žepa to the southeast.
