= Goduš =

- Village
- Location within Bosnia and Herzegovina
- Coordinates: 44.5257612°N 18.94712°E
- Country: Bosnia and Herzegovina
- Entity: Federation of Bosnia and Herzegovina
- Canton: Tuzla
- Municipality: Sapna

Area
  - Total: 4.47 sq mi (11.58 km^{2})

Population (2013)
  - Total: 1,104
  - Density: 246.9/sq mi (95.34/km^{2})

Goduš is a village in the municipality of Sapna, Bosnia and Herzegovina.

== Demographics ==
According to the 2013 census, its population was 1,104.

Ethnicity in 2013
Ethnicity	Number	Percentage
Bosniaks	1,097	99.4%
other/undeclared	7	0.6%
Total	1,104	100%
