= Vitinica, Sapna =

Vitinica
- Village
- Location within Bosnia and Herzegovina
- Coordinates: 44.5116205°N 19.006412°E
- Country: Bosnia and Herzegovina
- Entity: Republika Srpska; Federation of Bosnia and Herzegovina
- Region Canton: Bijeljina; Tuzla
- Municipality: Zvornik; Sapna

Area
  - Total: 4.62 sq mi (11.96 km^{2})

Population (2013)
  - Total: 2,833
  - Density: 613.5/sq mi (236.9/km^{2})

Vitinica is a village in the municipalities of Sapna, Federation Bosnia and Herzegovina.

== Demographics ==
According to the 2013 census, its population was 2,833, with only two of them living in the Zvornik part thus 2,831 in the Sapna part.

Ethnicity in 2013
Ethnicity	Number	Percentage
Bosniaks	2,820	99.5%
Serbs	2	0.1%
other/undeclared	11	0.4%
Total	2,833	100%

== Notable people ==
- Suvada Selimović (born 1965), Bosnian activist and pacifist
