= Priboj, Lopare =

Priboj
- Village
- Location within Bosnia and Herzegovina
- Coordinates: 44.6015°N 18.9301°E
- Country: Bosnia and Herzegovina
- Entity: Republic of Srpska
- Region Canton: Bijeljina; Tuzla
- Municipality: Lopare; Teočak

Area
  - Total: 6.76 sq mi (17.51 km^{2})

Population (2013)
  - Total: 1,358
  - Density: 200.9/sq mi (77.56/km^{2})
- Time zone: UTC+1 (CET)
  - Summer (DST): UTC+2 (CEST)

Priboj is a village in the municipalities of Lopare (Republika Srpska) and Teočak, Tuzla Canton, Bosnia and Herzegovina.

== Demographics ==
According to the 2013 census, its population was 1,358, all of them living in the Lopare part, thus none in Teočak.

Ethnicity in 2013
| Ethnicity | Number | Percentage |
|---|---|---|
| Serbs | 1,348 | 99.3% |
| Croats | 9 | 0.7% |
| other/undeclared | 1 | 0.1% |
| Total | 1,358 | 100% |
