= Baljkovica =

- Village
- Location within Bosnia and Herzegovina
- Coordinates: 44.4436°N 18.9700°E
- Country: Bosnia and Herzegovina
- Entity: Federation of Bosnia and Herzegovina
- Region Canton: Bijeljina; Tuzla
- Municipality: Zvornik; Sapna

Area
  - Total: 3.42 sq mi (8.87 km^{2})

Population (2013)
  - Total: 183
  - Density: 53.4/sq mi (20.6/km^{2})

Baljkovica is a village in the municipalities of Zvornik (Republika Srpska) and Sapna, Bosnia and Herzegovina.

== Demographics ==
According to the 2013 census, its population was 183, with 35 of them living in the Zvornik part thus 148 in the Sapna part.

Ethnicity in 2013
Ethnicity	Number	Percentage
Bosniaks	122	66.7%
Croats	0	0.0%
Serbs	61	33.3%
other/undeclared	0	0.0%
Total	183	100%
