= Trnova, Ugljevik =

Coordinates: 44°39′28″N 19°06′06″E

Trnova Трнова
Location	Ugljevik, Republika Srpska, Bosnia-Herzegovina
Population – (est.) – (1991 census)	2600; 2632
Area code	+387 55
Time zone	CET (UTC +1); CEST (UTC +2)
Website

Trnova (Cyrillic: Трнова) is a populated location near the town of Ugljevik, in the Republika Srpska zone of Bosnia-Herzegovina. It is divided between Gornja Trnova, where in 1991 nearly all residents were Serbs, and Srednja Trnova, where in the same year most were Bosniaks.

== Gornja Trnova ==
The total population of Gornja Trnova is 420, comprising 413 Serbs (98.33%), 2 Croats (0.47%), 2 Yugoslavs (0.47%) and 3 others and unknown (0.71%.)

== Srednja Trnova ==
Out of Srednja Trnova's population, 682 (94.59%) were Bosniaks, 24 (3.32%) were Yugoslavs, 12 (1.66%) were Serbs and 3 (0.41%) were others and unknown.

== Notable people ==
- Filip Višnjić
- Hajrudin Mešić
