= Brijest, Lopare =

Brijest
- Village
- Location within Bosnia and Herzegovina
- Coordinates: 44.6121°N 19.0097°E
- Country: Bosnia and Herzegovina
- Entity: Federation of Bosnia and Herzegovina
- Region Canton: Bijeljina; Tuzla
- Municipality: Lopare; Teočak

Area
  - Total: 2.16 sq mi (5.59 km^{2})

Population (2013)
  - Total: 201
  - Density: 93.1/sq mi (36.0/km^{2})
- Time zone: UTC+1 (CET)
  - Summer (DST): UTC+2 (CEST)

Brijest is a village in the municipalities of Lopare (Republika Srpska) and Teočak, Tuzla Canton, Bosnia and Herzegovina.

== Demographics ==
According to the 2013 census, its population was 201, all Serbs with 196 of them living in the Lopare part, and 5 in Teočak.
