= Teočak-Krstac =

Teočak
- Village
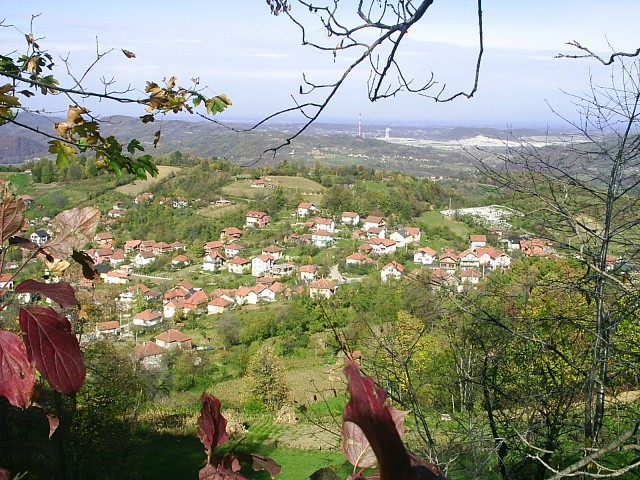
- Teocak viewpoint

- Location within Bosnia and Herzegovina
- Coordinates: 44.6010°N 18.9679°E
- Country: Bosnia and Herzegovina
- Entity: Federation of Bosnia and Herzegovina
- Canton: Tuzla
- Municipality: Teočak

Area
  - Total: 2.43 sq mi (6.29 km^{2})

Population (2013)
  - Total: 2,763
  - Density: 1,140/sq mi (439/km^{2})
- Time zone: UTC+1 (CET)
  - Summer (DST): UTC+2 (CEST)

Teočak is a village in the municipality of Teočak, Bosnia and Herzegovina.

== Demographics ==
According to the 2013 census, its population was 2,763.

Ethnicity in 2013
Ethnicity	Number	Percentage
Bosniaks	2,749	99.5%
Croats	3	0.1%
Serbians	1	0.0%
other/undeclared	10	0.4%
Total	2,763	100%
