= Banj brdo =

Tourist and recreation place in Banja Luka

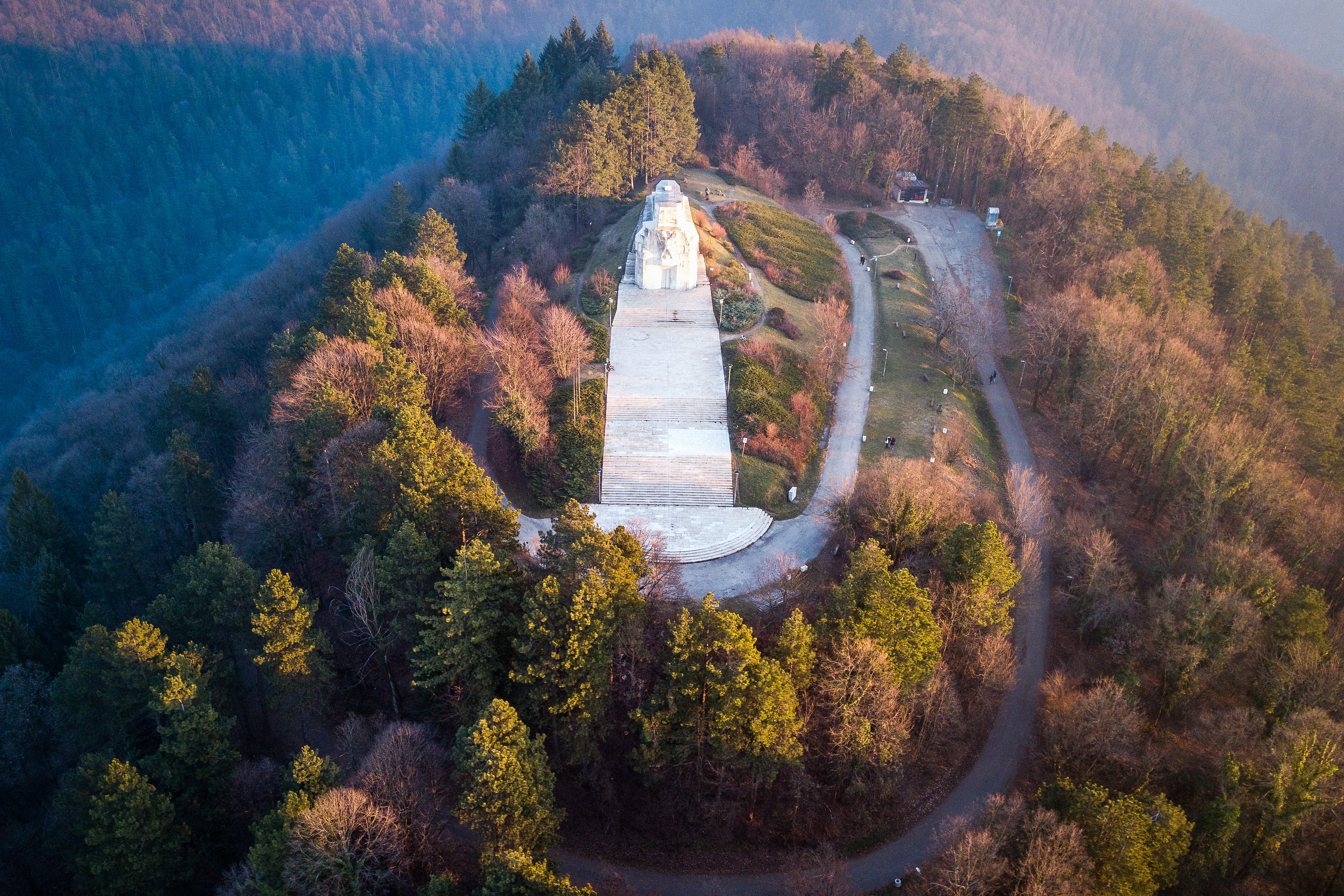
Banj brdo

Banj brdo (Serbian Cyrillic: Бањ брдо, which can be translated as Banj hill), before known as Šehitluci (Serbian Cyrillic: Шехитлуци) is a 431 meter hill as well as tourist and recreation place in Banja Luka, part of the Bjeljavina mountain.

On top of the hill stands the Monument to fallen Krajina soldiers, a work of Antun Augustinčić and dedicated to the dead soldiers of the People Liberation War in Bosanska Krajina. It is possible to see the whole city of Banja Luka from this place. The serpentine road on Banj brdo that leads to the monument was made between 1932 and 1933 and a small tourist bus between the top of the hill and the city of Banja Luka is circulating on it during the day (from April 22 to September 30).

== Name of the hill ==
After the War in Bosnia, the name Šehitluci was changed into Banj brdo because of the etymology of the old name. The word šehitluci is derived from the Turkish word šehid, which means Muslim soldier. Also, there are some legends connected with the name Šehitluci. The name is among other things linked with the Battle of Banja Luka in 1737 when legend says that some Muslim soldiers were beheaded and ran from the Hiseta neighborhood to today's Banj brdo with their heads in hands. They arrived at one spring where they died. It is considered that they were buried on top of the hill, in a turbe - a closed Muslim grave building above the surface. On the very same place, the rulers of the Vrbas banovina built a pyramid as monument for those who had died and from that time on the hill was named Šehitluci.

== See also ==
- Banja Luka
