= Roki Vulović =

Bosnian Serb singer

Rodoljub Roki Vulović
- Родољуб Роки Вуловић
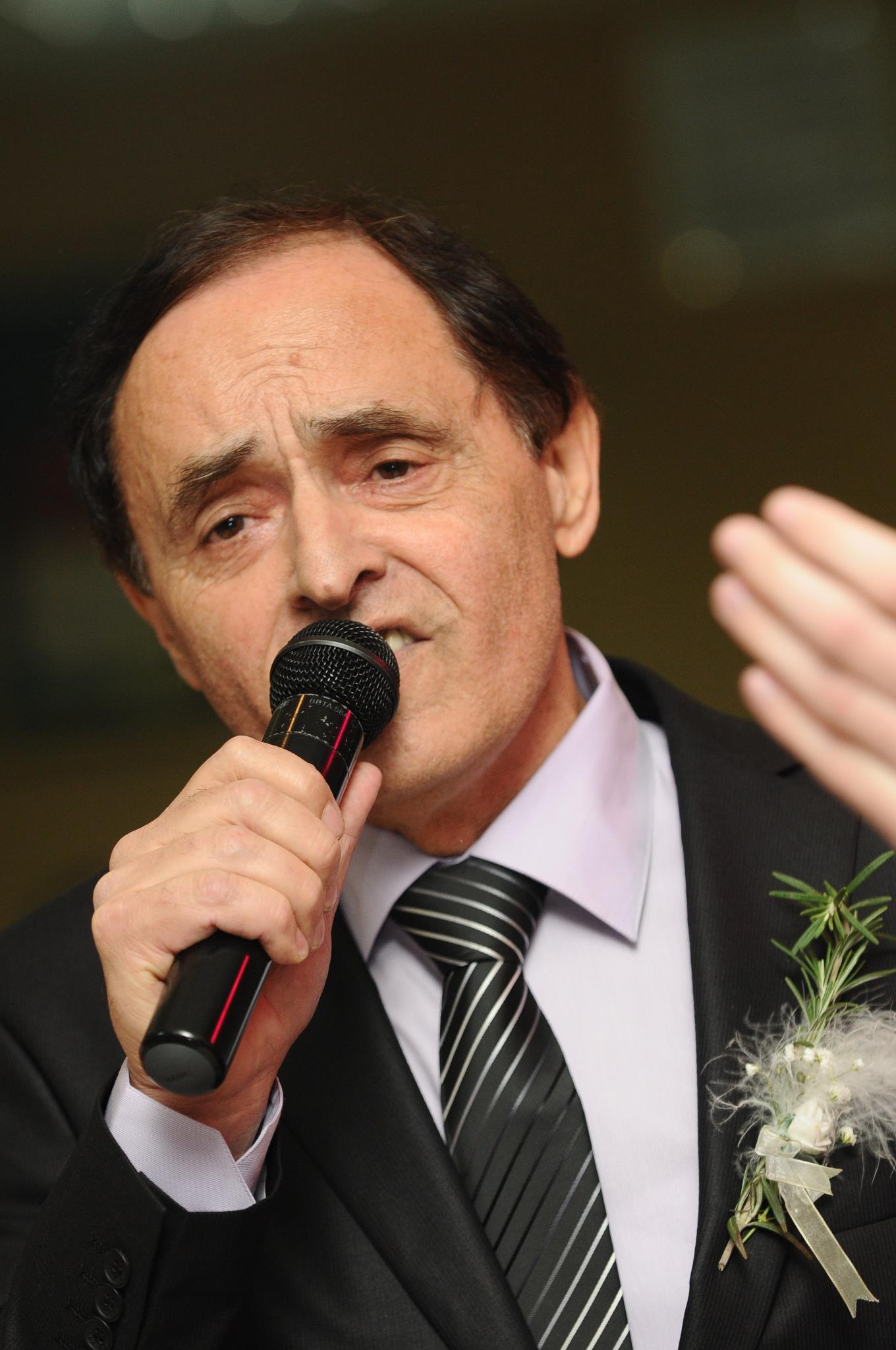
- Vulovic in 2013
- Born: Rodoljub Vulović; 1 May 1955 (age 71); Bijeljina, PR Bosnia and Herzegovina, FPR Yugoslavia
- Occupations: singer; professor; schoolteacher; songwriter; military personnel
- Notable work: Panteri – Mauzer (1992); Gavrina brigada (1992); Garda Panteri (1993); Srpska Garda (1995); Crni Bombarder (1995)
- Height: 1.72 m (5 ft 8 in)
- Spouse: Jelica Vulović
- Children: 2
- Musical career
- Genres: Turbo-folk; pop rock
- Instruments: Vocals; acoustic guitar; piano
- Years active: 1972–present
- Labels: PGP-RTB; Jugodisk; Renome; Jahorina Records

Rodoljub Vulović (Serbian Cyrillic: Родољуб Вуловић; born on 1 May 1955), more commonly known by his stage name Roki Vulović (Serbian Cyrillic: Роки Вуловић), is a Bosnian Serb folk singer and songwriter. He is often described as a turbo-folk singer and is known for his Serbian war songs. He is best known for his 1992 album Semberski junaci and the single "Panteri – Mauzer" about the Garda Panteri, the most elite unit of the Army of Republika Srpska.

== Early life ==
Vulović was born between the night of April 30 and morning of May 1, 1955 in Bijeljina, PR Bosnia and Herzegovina into a Serbian-Montenegrin family. His grandfather was from Montenegro, and his father was a prisoner of war in Germany during World War II.

== Musical career ==
Vulović began his music career in 1975 with his first studio album Kristina (Christina). In 1988, he released his second studio album Paša and started a concert tour across Western European countries with a significant population from the Serbian diaspora.

=== 1992–1997: Fame during the Yugoslav Wars ===
He released a studio album, Semberski junaci, (Heroes of Semberija) in 1992, dedicated to those injured during the Bosnian War. The album made him popular among Serbs across the Balkans in large part due to the song "Panteri – Mauzer" (Panthers of Mauzer) praising the Garda Panteri, an elite unit of the Army of Republika Srpska. In part due to the notoriety that followed the album's release, Vulović enlisted into the Garda Panteri himself.

Vulović went on to record additional studio albums with patriotic and anti-NATO overtones, including Panteri (Panthers; 1993)

Vulović recorded his last studio album Zbog tebe (Because of you) in 1997 and ceased performing after its release. He consequently returned to his hometown to become a professor at the local Mihajlo Pupin Technical School and worked as a chairman of the Serbian Polytechnic and Pharmacy School until 2013.

Vulović's Serbian patriotism and anti-NATO views during the war made him a controversial figure, even though his lyrics are uncharacteristic among certain other singers from the Yugoslav conflict in that they do not specifically mention any oppositional nations or countries, and avoid overt bias and xenophobia in the lyrics. However, the implicit bias of his music has made him a popular fixture amongst Serbian patriots. The recent availability of his music videos online, especially on YouTube, has made Vulović a popular target of meme culture in the ex-Yugoslav diaspora due to their characteristic low-budget aesthetic.

== Personal life ==
He is married to fellow Serbian musician Jelica Vulović and has two children, Vladimir and Miljana. He speaks French, German and Italian fluently. He is a fan of international travel, especially to Western European countries with a large Serbian population. Notably, his entry visa to the United States has been denied several times due to his anti-NATO views in the 1990s.

== Discography ==
=== Albums ===
- Paša (1988)
- Semberski Junaci (1992)
- Panteri (1993)
- Junaci Kozarski (1994)
- Crni Bombarder (1995)
- Zbog Tebe (1997)
- Otadžbini na dar (2001)

=== Solo ===
- Kristina (1972)
- U srcu te čuvam (2018)
- Ne plači (2020)
- Pukni zoro (2020)
- Majevica (2022)
