= Lukavica, Čelić =

Lukavica
- Village
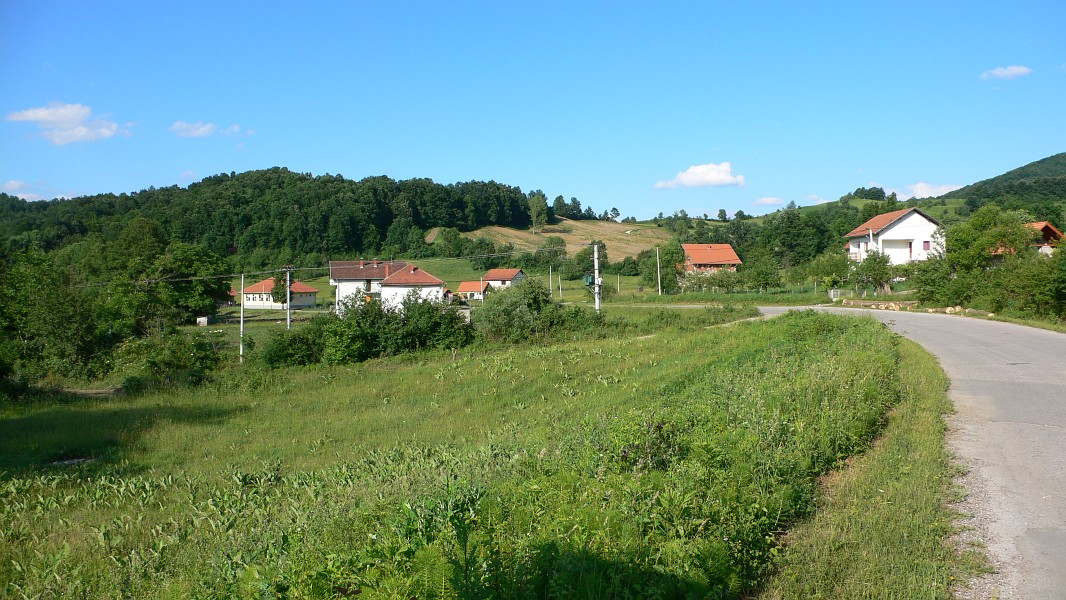

- Location within Bosnia and Herzegovina
- Coordinates: 44.7044675°N 18.7469911°E
- Country: Bosnia and Herzegovina
- Entity: Federation of Bosnia and Herzegovina
- Canton: Tuzla
- Municipality: Čelić

Area
  - Total: 3.37 sq mi (8.73 km^{2})

Population (2013)
  - Total: 141
  - Density: 41.8/sq mi (16.2/km^{2})
- Time zone: UTC+1 (CET)
  - Summer (DST): UTC+2 (CEST)

Lukavica is a village in the municipalities of Čelić, Tuzla Canton, Bosnia and Herzegovina.

== Demographics ==
According to the 2013 census, its population was 141, with 52 of them living in the Lopare part, and 89 in Čelić.

Ethnicity in 2013
Ethnicity	Number	Percentage
Serbs	138	97.9%
other/undeclared	3	2.1%
Total	141	100%
