= Operation Cerska '93 =

Military operation during the Bosnian War

Cerska '93
- Part of the Bosnian War
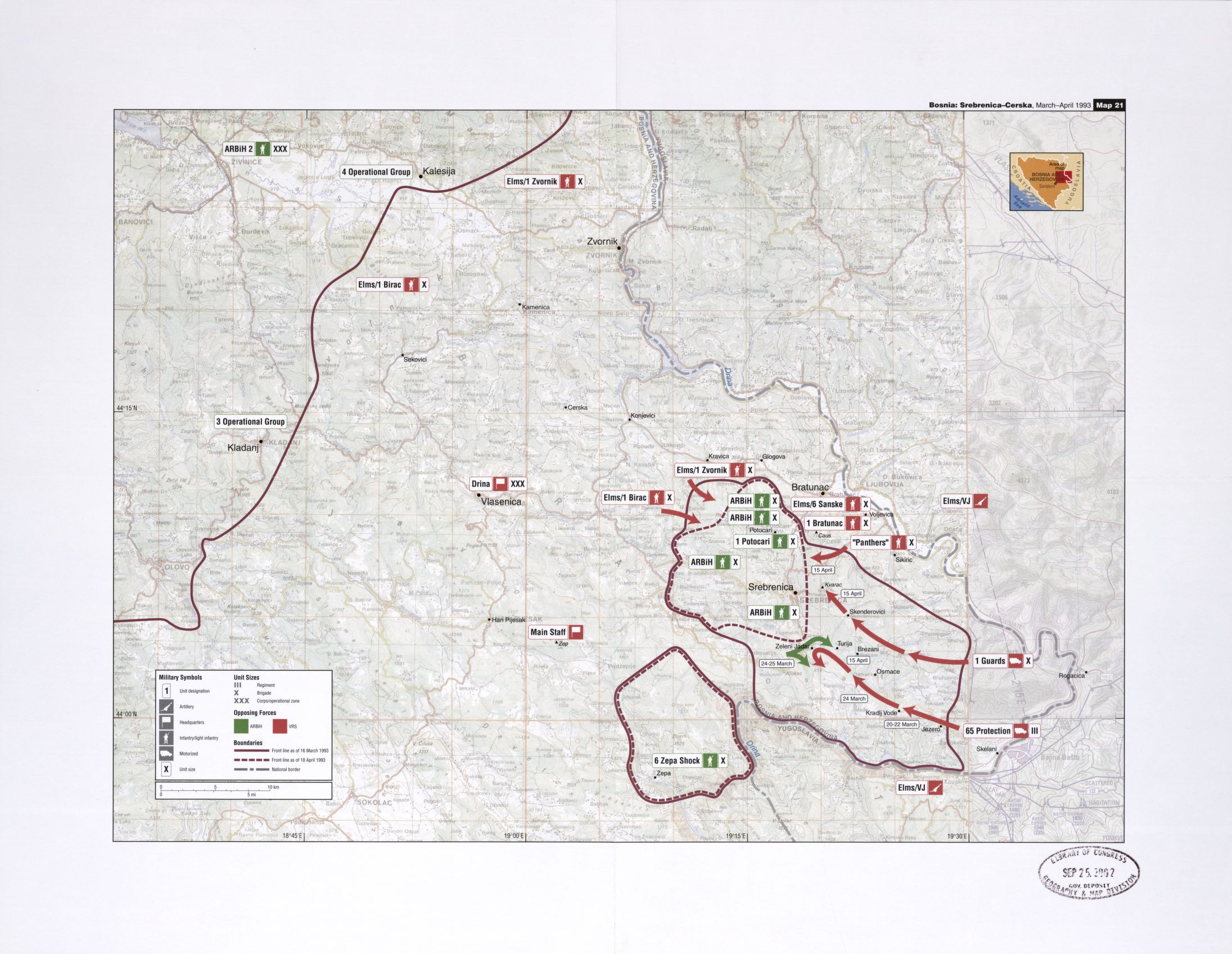
- A map of the Operations (March–April 1993)
Date	10 February – 17 April 1993
Location	Podrinje, eastern Bosnia and Herzegovina
Result	Army of Republika Srpska victory: The VRS recaptures territories south, north and east of Srebrenica; Demilitarisation agreement reached for the Srebrenica area under UNPROFOR supervision

Belligerents
Republika Srpska	Republic of Bosnia and Herzegovina

Commanders and leaders
Ratko Mladić	Naser Orić

Units involved
Army of Republika Srpska: 1st Guards Brigade; 65th Protection Motorized Regiment; Garda Panteri; Zvornik Brigade	Army of the Republic of Bosnia and Herzegovina: 28th Podrinje Independent Division

Strength
10,000	4,000–6,000

Casualties and losses
43 killed, 71 wounded (by 14 April)	Several hundred killed or wounded (estimated)

Operation "Cerska '93" (Serbo-Croatian: Operacija "Cerska '93", Операција "Церска '93") was a military operation carried out by the Army of Republika Srpska (VRS) in early 1993 during the Bosnian War. The goal of the operation was to recapture parts of the Podrinje region around Cerska and Srebrenica that had been taken by the Army of the Republic of Bosnia and Herzegovina.

== Background ==
In early 1993, ARBiH units from Srebrenica advanced westward, pushing back elements of the VRS Bratunac Brigade and Birač Brigade to link with the enclave around Cerska. In mid-January, ARBiH forces launched limited cross-border shelling into the Federal Republic of Yugoslavia, targeting the small towns of Ljubovija and Bajina Bašta.

In response, the VRS, with logistical and intelligence support from Yugoslav elements, launched a counter-offensive under the codename "Cerska '93", designed to reclaim control over the Drina valley corridor and neutralize ARBiH positions threatening Bratunac and Zvornik.

== Operation ==
Due to the number of formations involved, the Main Staff of the Army of Republika Srpska took direct command. The assault included the 65th Protection Motorized Regiment, the 1st Guards Motorized Brigade, the Garda Panteri, the 1st Zvornik Brigade, and supporting elements from Yugoslav special units, including the 63rd Parachute and 72nd Brigade for Special Operations.

=== Phase I: Battle for Cerska (10 February – 1 March 1993) ===
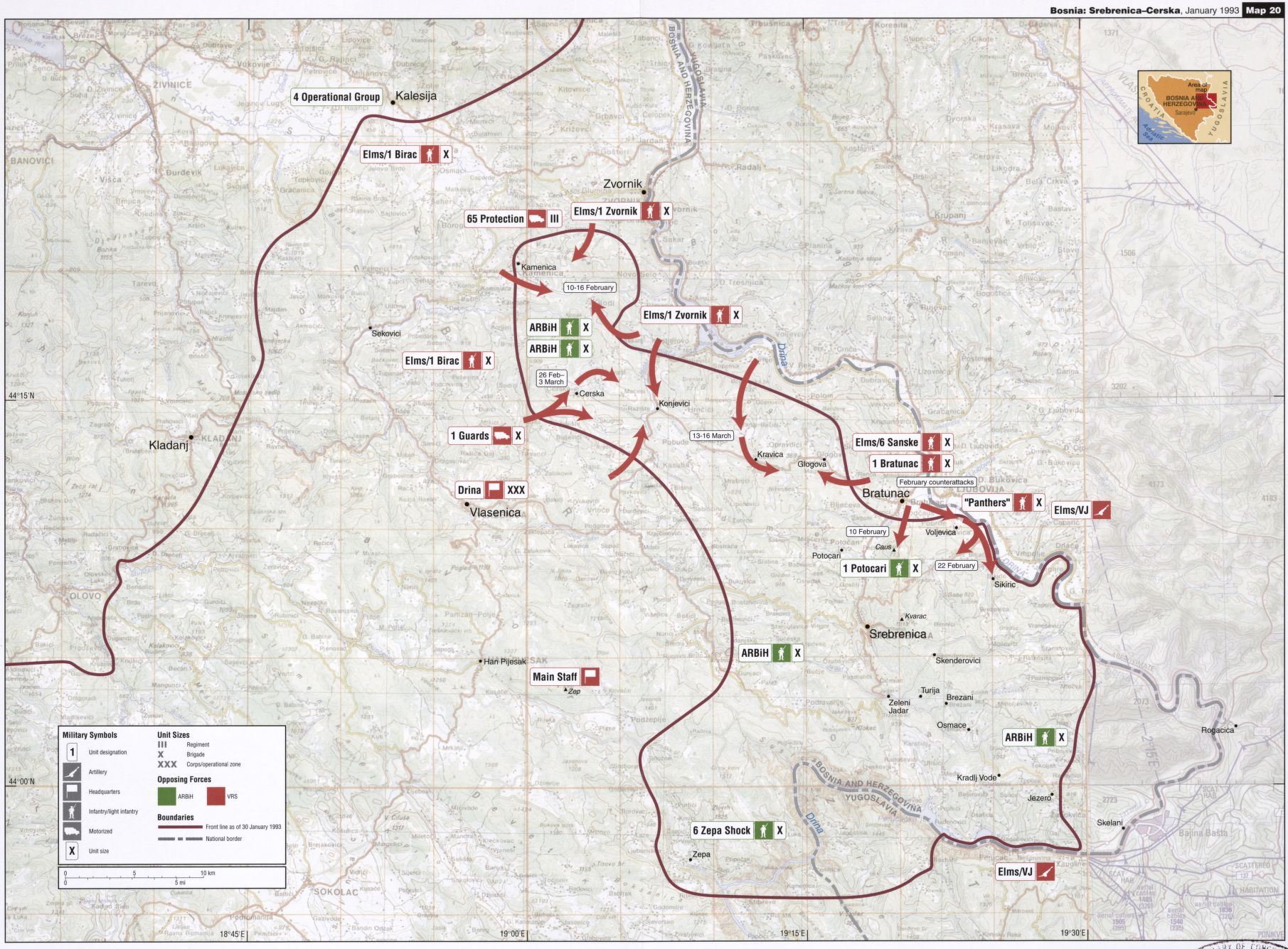
The Cerska–Srebrenica front, February–March 1993

VRS forces attacked from the north (Zvornik–Kamenica axis) and southwest toward Cerska. The 65th Protection Regiment and the Panthers Guard pushed ARBiH troops out of several villages, while the 1st Guards Brigade entered Cerska from the southwest. The ARBiH withdrew toward Srebrenica after several days of fighting.

=== Phase II: Battle for Konjević Polje (13–16 March 1993) ===
The VRS aimed to secure the Bratunac–Konjević Polje–Zvornik road corridor. The 65th Protection Regiment and 1st Guards Brigade attacked from the northwest, while the Garda Panteri and 6th Sanska Brigade moved from the south with armoured support from the Yugoslav Army.

=== Phase III: Advance on Srebrenica (20 March – 17 April 1993) ===
VRS forces continued advancing along the Skelani–Srebrenica axis, supported by Yugoslav special units, while other VRS elements attacked from the Bratunac direction. After several weeks of intense fighting, including around the industrial suburb "Zeleni Jadar," the VRS seized key heights around Srebrenica. Following these engagements, Naser Orić and Ratko Mladić agreed to a demilitarisation of the enclave under UNPROFOR supervision.

== Aftermath ==
The operation restored VRS control over most of the territory south, north, and east of Srebrenica. It also secured the right bank of the Drina River, isolating the ARBiH-held enclave of Srebrenica and paving the way for its later demilitarisation. The fighting caused several hundred casualties on both sides.

According to evidence presented before the International Criminal Tribunal for the former Yugoslavia (ICTY), special units from the Serbian State Security also participated in coordination with VRS forces during operations in eastern Bosnia in early 1993.

== Sources ==
- Central Intelligence Agency, Office of Russian and European Analysis (2002). Balkan Battlegrounds: A Military History of the Yugoslav Conflict, 1990–1995. Vol. 1. Washington, D.C.: Central Intelligence Agency. ISBN 978-0-16-066472-4.
- Central Intelligence Agency, Office of Russian and European Analysis (2002). Balkan Battlegrounds: A Military History of the Yugoslav Conflict, 1990–1995. Vol. 2. Washington, D.C.: Central Intelligence Agency. ISBN 978-0-16-066472-4.
