= Međeđa, Sapna =

Međeđa
- Village
- Location within Bosnia and Herzegovina
- Coordinates: 44.4754398°N 18.9563825°E
- Country: Bosnia and Herzegovina
- Entity: Federation of Bosnia and Herzegovina
- Canton: Tuzla
- Municipality: Sapna

Area
  - Total: 1.80 sq mi (4.66 km^{2})

Population (2013)
  - Total: 1,220
  - Density: 678/sq mi (262/km^{2})

Međeđa is a village in the municipality of Sapna, Bosnia and Herzegovina.

== Demographics ==
According to the 2013 census, its population was 1,220.

Ethnicity in 2013
Ethnicity	Number	Percentage
Bosniaks	1,191	97.6%
other/undeclared	29	2.4%
Total	1,220	100%
