= Dokanj =

- Village
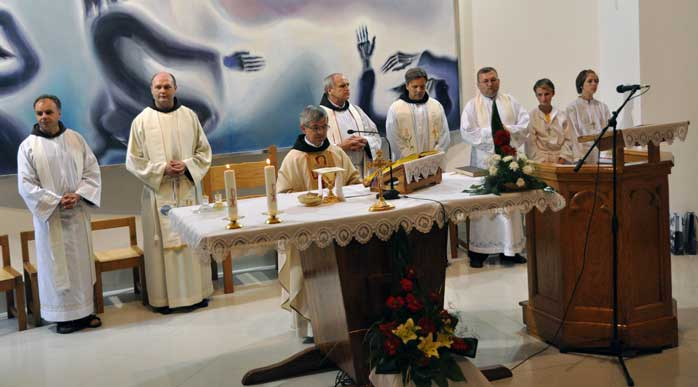
- Dokanj proslava patrona 2011

- Location within Bosnia and Herzegovina
- Coordinates: 44.5921391°N 18.6749289°E
- Country: Bosnia and Herzegovina
- Entity: Federation of Bosnia and Herzegovina
- Canton: Tuzla
- Municipality: Tuzla

Area
  - Total: 6.81 sq mi (17.65 km^{2})

Population (2013)
  - Total: 977
  - Density: 143/sq mi (55.4/km^{2})
- Time zone: UTC+1 (CET)
  - Summer (DST): UTC+2 (CEST)

Dokanj is a village in the municipality of Tuzla, Tuzla Canton, Bosnia and Herzegovina.

== Demographics ==
According to the 2013 census, its population was 977.

Ethnicity in 2013
Ethnicity	Number	Percentage
Croats	597	61.1%
Serbs	179	18.3%
Bosniaks	171	17.5%
other/undeclared	30	3.1%
Total	977	100%
