= Piperi, Lopare =

Piperi
- Village
- Location within Bosnia and Herzegovina
- Coordinates: 44.6618042°N 18.7278619°E
- Country: Bosnia and Herzegovina
- Entities: Republika Srpska; Federation of Bosnia and Herzegovina
- Region; Canton: Bijeljina; Tuzla
- Municipalities: Lopare; Čelić

Area
  - Total: 5.36 sq mi (13.88 km^{2})

Population (2013)
  - Total: 915
  - Density: 171/sq mi (65.9/km^{2})
- Time zone: UTC+1 (CET)
  - Summer (DST): UTC+2 (CEST)

Piperi is a village in the municipalities of Lopare (Republika Srpska) and Čelić (Tuzla Canton, Federation of Bosnia and Herzegovina) in the country of Bosnia and Herzegovina.

== Demographics ==
According to the 2013 census, its population was 915; of these, 873 live in the sector of Piperi that falls within the Lopare municipality, and 42 in the part that is within the Čelić municipality.

Ethnicity in 2013
Ethnicity	Number	Percentage
Serbs	894	97.7%
Bosniaks	16	1.7%
Croats	3	0.3%
Other / undeclared	2	0.2%
Total	915	100%

== See also ==
- Municipalities of Bosnia and Herzegovina
- Political divisions of Bosnia and Herzegovina
