= Rastošnica =

- Village
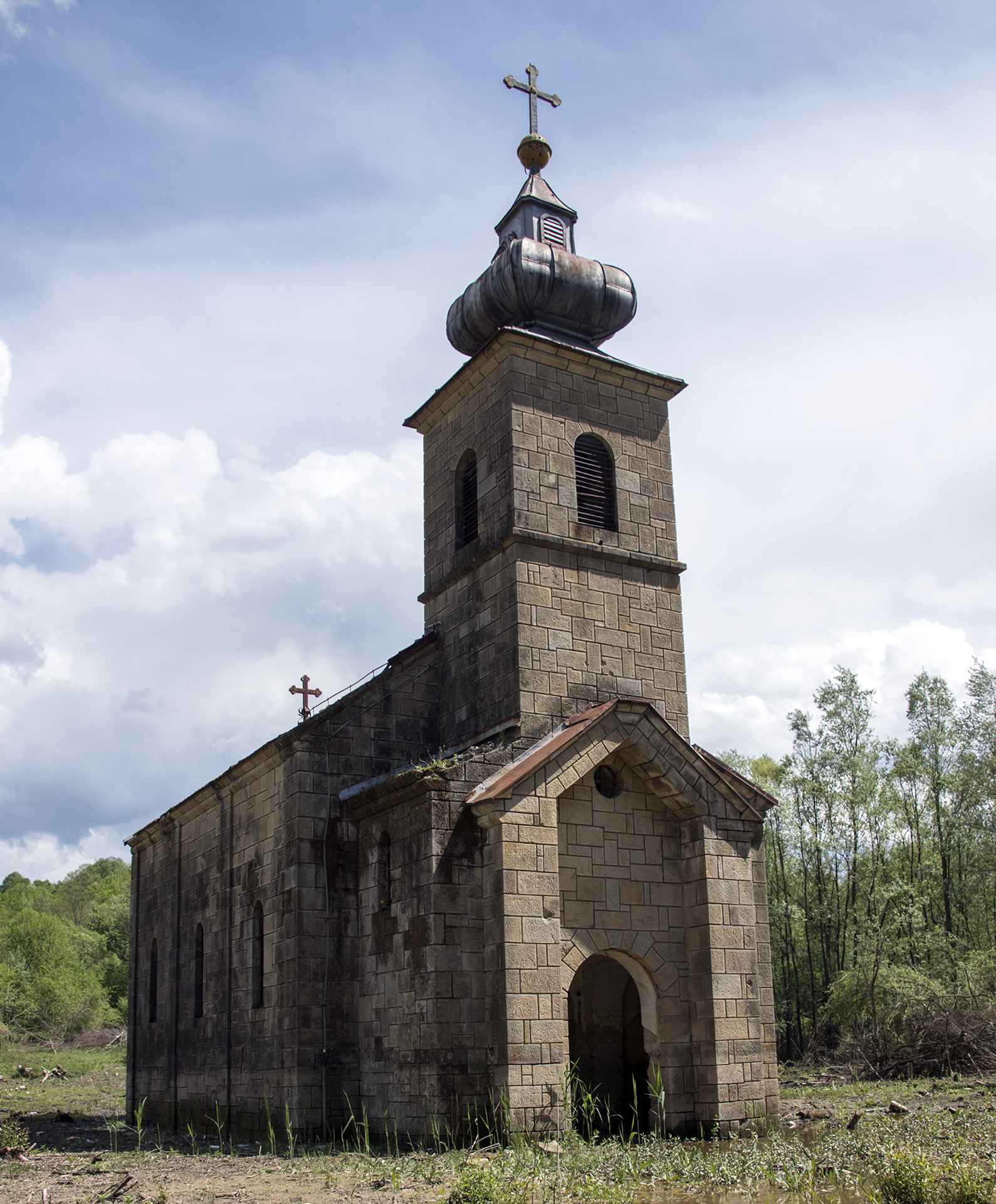

- Location within Bosnia and Herzegovina
- Coordinates: 44.5637669°N 18.9601966°E
- Country: Bosnia and Herzegovina
- Entity: Federation of Bosnia and Herzegovina
- Canton: Tuzla
- Municipality: Sapna

Area
  - Total: 17.12 sq mi (44.33 km^{2})

Population (2013)
  - Total: 223
  - Density: 13.0/sq mi (5.03/km^{2})

Rastošnica is a village in the municipality of Sapna, Bosnia and Herzegovina.

== Demographics ==
According to the 2013 census, its population was 223.

Ethnicity in 2013
| Ethnicity | Number | Percentage |
|---|---|---|
| Serbs | 192 | 86.1% |
| Bosniaks | 30 | 13.5% |
| Croats | 1 | 0.4% |
| Total | 223 | 100% |
