= Order of Nemanjići =

Republika Srpska order

Order of Nemanjići Орден Немањића
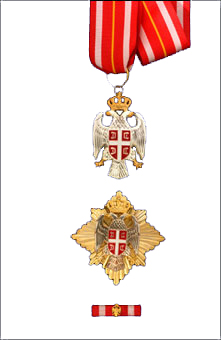
- Order of Nemanjići (top: Order medal; bottom: Order ribbon)
- Type: Military
- Awarded for: "for prominent military feats in the armed struggle, as well as organizing and leading the defense of the Serbian people and state"
- Presented by: Republika Srpska
- Status: Active
- Established: 28 April 1993
- Ribbon bar of the Order of Nemanjići

Precedence
- Next (higher): Order of the Republika Srpska
- Next (lower): Order of the Flag of Republika Srpska

The Order of Nemanjići (Serbian: Орден Немањића) is an Order of the Republika Srpska. It is established in 1993 by the Constitution of Republika Srpska and 'Law on orders and awards' valid since 28 April 1993.

This order is awarded for prominent military feats in the armed struggle, as well as organizing and leading the defense of the Serbian people and state.

It is named after Nemanjić dynasty.

== See also ==
- Nemanjić dynasty
- Orders, decorations and medals of Republika Srpska
