= Sapna =

Sapna Сапна
- Town and municipality
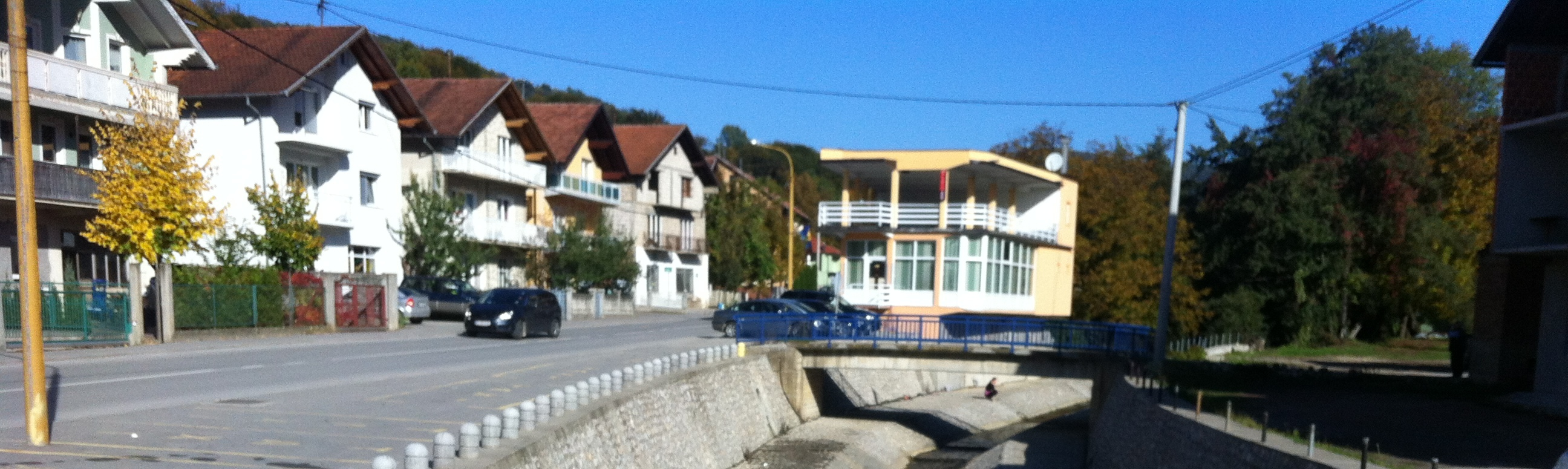

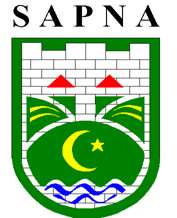
- Seal

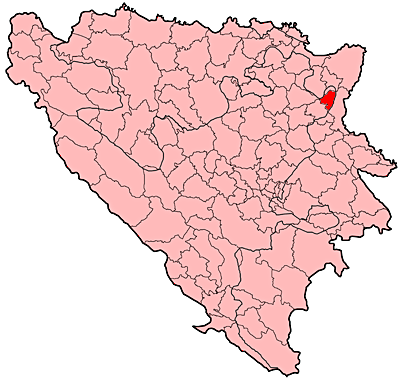
- Location of Sapna within Bosnia and Herzegovina.
- Coordinates: 44°29′39″N 19°0′7″E
- Country: Bosnia and Herzegovina
- Entity: Federation of Bosnia and Herzegovina
- Canton: Tuzla Canton
- Geographical region: Podrinje
- Boroughs: Federation

Government
  - Municipal mayor: Zudin Mahmutović (SDA)

Area
  - Total: 118 km^{2} (46 sq mi)

Population (2013 census)
  - Total: 12,136
  - Density: 103/km^{2} (270/sq mi)
- Time zone: UTC+1 (CET)
  - Summer (DST): UTC+2 (CEST)
- Area code: +387 35
- Website: www.opcinasapna.ba

Sapna (Serbian Cyrillic: Сапна) is a town and municipality located in Tuzla Canton of the Federation of Bosnia and Herzegovina, an entity of Bosnia and Herzegovina.

== History ==
People have lived in the Sapna region since the earliest days. In the Middle Ages, Sapna was an important transit route between the then towns of Zvornik and Teočak. When the Ottoman Turks came, the area was placed under the administrative unit called the Zvornik Sandžak, which was created between 1478 and 1483. During Austro-Hungarian rule this was part of the Zvornik Kotar, and in early Yugoslavia it was part of the Zvornik Srez.

Before the Bosnian War, Sapna was part of the Zvornik municipality. But, as a result of the Dayton Agreement, the Zvornik municipality was divided between the two entities, Federation of Bosnia and Herzegovina and Republika Srpska, so Sapna became a municipality itself, comprising the portion of Zvornik municipality that remained in the Federation of BiH. Sapna officially became a municipality on March 8, 1998.

== Settlements ==
The other villages within Sapna Municipality are Baljkovica, Goduš, Hanđelići, Kobilići, Kovačevići, Međeđa, Nezuk, Rastošnica, Selimovići, Skakovica, Vitinica and Zaseok.

== Demographics ==
Before the war, Sapna had a population of 13,500, with a density of 114,4 people per km^{2}. Both the town and municipality also have the highest percentage of Bosniaks relative to population in all of Bosnia and Herzegovina.

Town of Sapna, census 2013

total: 2,027

- Bosniaks — 2,023 (99.8%)
- Serbs — 0 (0.0%)
- Croats — 0 (0.0%)
- others and unknown — 4 (0.2%)

Municipality of Sapna, 2013

total: 11,178

- Bosniaks — 10,827 (96.9%)
- Serbs — 234 (0.0%)
- Croats — 3 (0.0%)
- others and unknown — 114 (1.0%)
