= Majevica =

Mountain range in Bosnia and Herzegovina

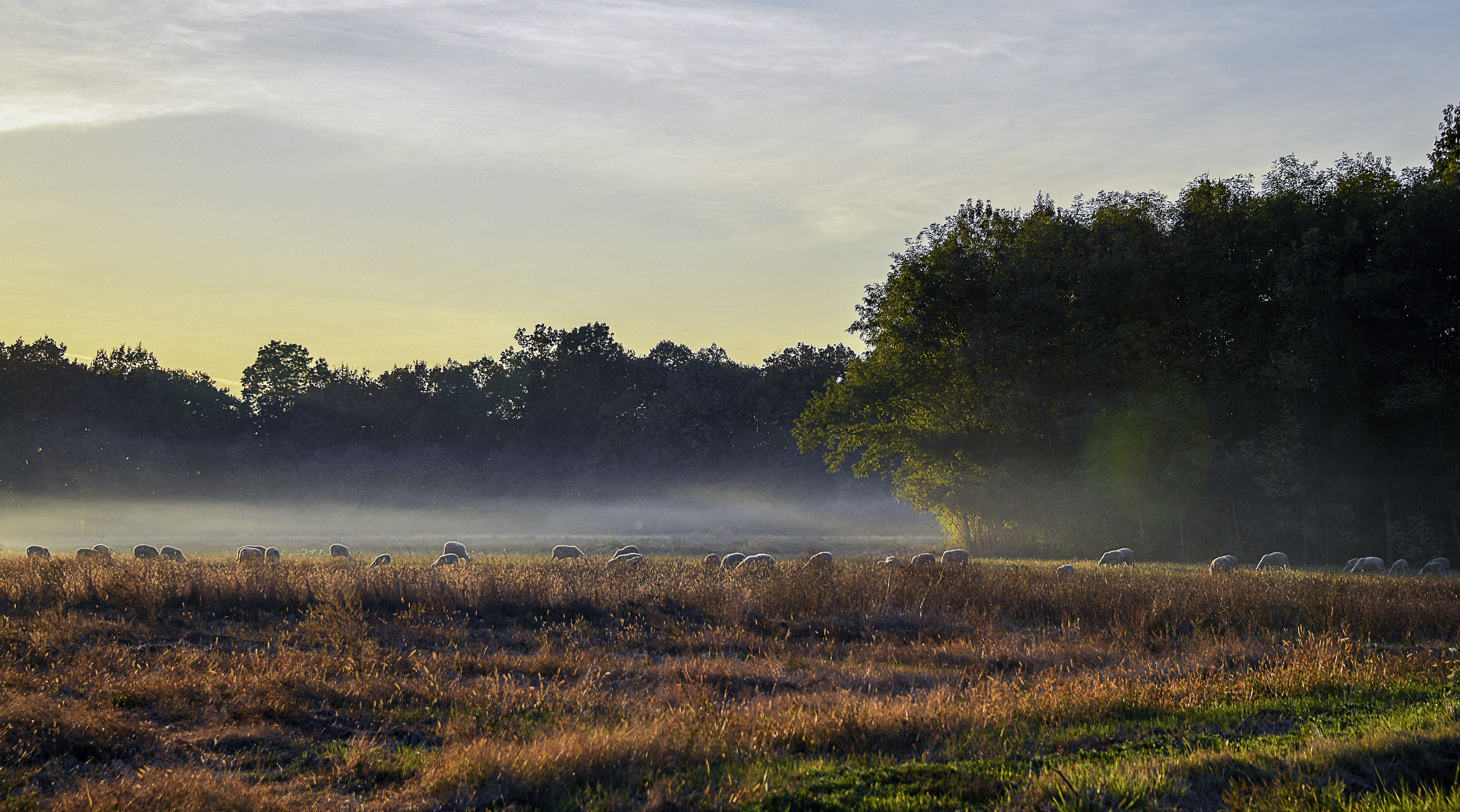

Highest point
- Peak: Stolice
- Elevation: 916 m (3,005 ft)
- Coordinates: 44°33′50″N 18°50′41″E

Dimensions
- Length: 50 km (31 mi)
- Width: 25 km (16 mi)

Geography
- Location within Bosnia and Herzegovina
- Location: Bosnia and Herzegovina

Majevica (Serbian Cyrillic: Мајевица, pronounced [mâjɛv̞it͡sa]) is a low mountain range in northeastern Bosnia and Herzegovina. It is situated between Semberija, Posavina, and Tuzla Canton.

Its highest peak is Stolice, some 16 kilometres east of Tuzla, in the far southeastern part of the range. Most of the range is located in the Federation of Bosnia and Herzegovina and part of it is in Republika Srpska. It is mostly forested.

== History ==
The area has been inhabited since prehistoric times, and is still populated today, with cities and towns located along the base of the range such as Srebrenik, Lopare, Čelić, Kalesija, and the regional center of Tuzla.

== See also ==
- Attack on Stolice
