= Teočak =

Teočak Теочак
- Municipality
- Flag

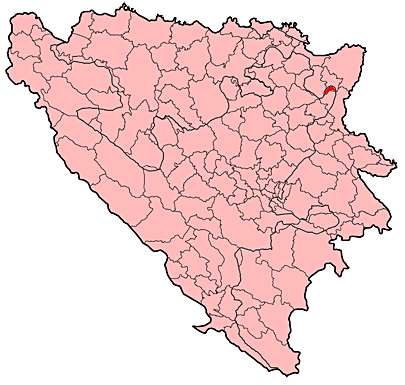
- Location of Teočak within Bosnia and Herzegovina.

- Location of Teočak
- Coordinates: 44°36′10″N 18°59′05″E
- Country: Bosnia and Herzegovina
- Entity: Federation of Bosnia and Herzegovina
- Canton: Tuzla Canton

Government
  - Municipal mayor: Tajib Muminović (SDA)

Area
  - Total: 30.37 km^{2} (11.73 sq mi)

Population (2013)
  - Total: 7,424
  - Density: 244.5/km^{2} (633.1/sq mi)
- Time zone: UTC+1 (CET)
  - Summer (DST): UTC+2 (CEST)
- Area code: +387 35
- Website: https://www.opcinateocak.ba

Teočak (Serbian Cyrillic: Теочак) is a municipality located in Tuzla Canton of the Federation of Bosnia and Herzegovina, an entity of Bosnia and Herzegovina. The center of the municipality is the village of Teočak-Krstac.

== Geography ==
The municipality borders the municipality of Lopare to the west, Ugljevik to the north and east, and Sapna to the south. It is administratively part of the Tuzla Canton in the Federation of Bosnia and Herzegovina.

== History ==
During the 1990s, due to the Bosnian war, the area of Teočak received several hundred Bosniak refugees from primarily the north and northeast areas of Teočak.

Before the war, Teočak was part of the Ugljevik municipality, and became itself a municipality as part of the Dayton Agreement.

== Religion ==
The total number of mosques in the Teočak municipality is 7.

== Demographics ==
According to the 2013 census, the municipality has a total of 7,424 inhabitants.

=== Population and ethnicity by settlement ===
Settlement	Total	Nationality							
Settlement	Total	Bosniaks	%	Croats	%	Serbs	%	Others	%
Bilalići	997	997	100	0	0	0	0	0	0
Brijest	5	0	0	0	0	5	100	0	0
Gornja Krčina	0	0	0	0	0	0	0	0	0
Jasenje	18	18	100	0	0	0	0	0	0
Jasikovac	939	938	99.9	1	0.1	0	0	0	0
Priboj	0	0	0	0	0	0	0	0	0
Sniježnica	1,690	1,684	99.6	1	0.1	1	0.1	4	0.2
Stari Teočak	797	797	100	0	0	0	0	0	0
Teočak-Krstac	2,763	2,749	99.5	3	0.1	1	0.03	10	0.4
Tursunovo Brdo	215	215	100	0	0	0	0	0	0
Municipality total	7,424	7,398	99.6	5	0.1	7	0.1	14	0.2

== Gallery ==
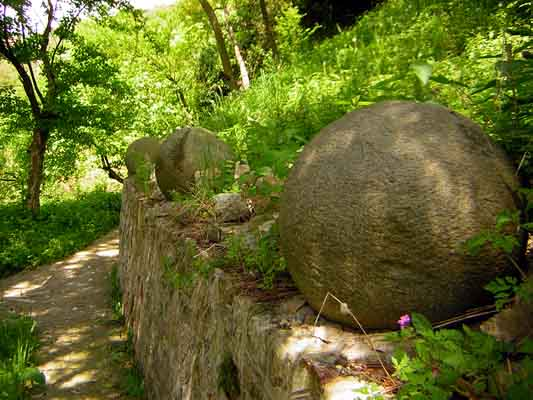
Ancient stone balls

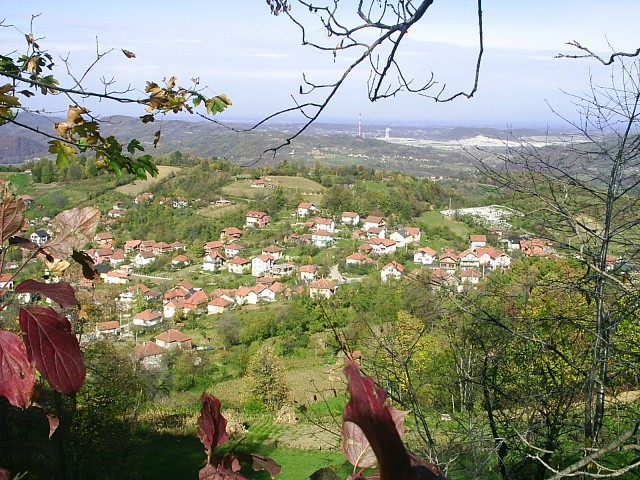
View on Teočak

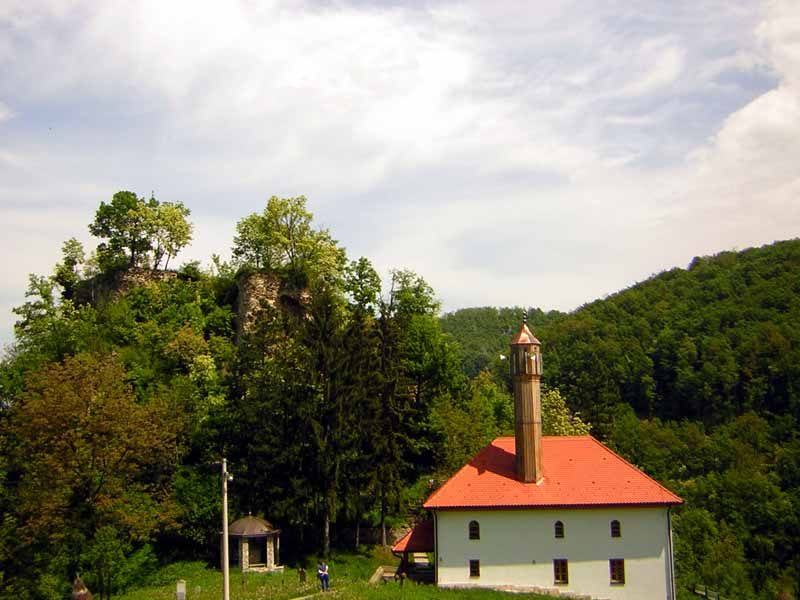
Fethija Mosque in Teočak
