= Battle of Vareš =

Battle between the HVO and the ARBiH

- Part of the Croat–Bosniak War of the Bosnian War
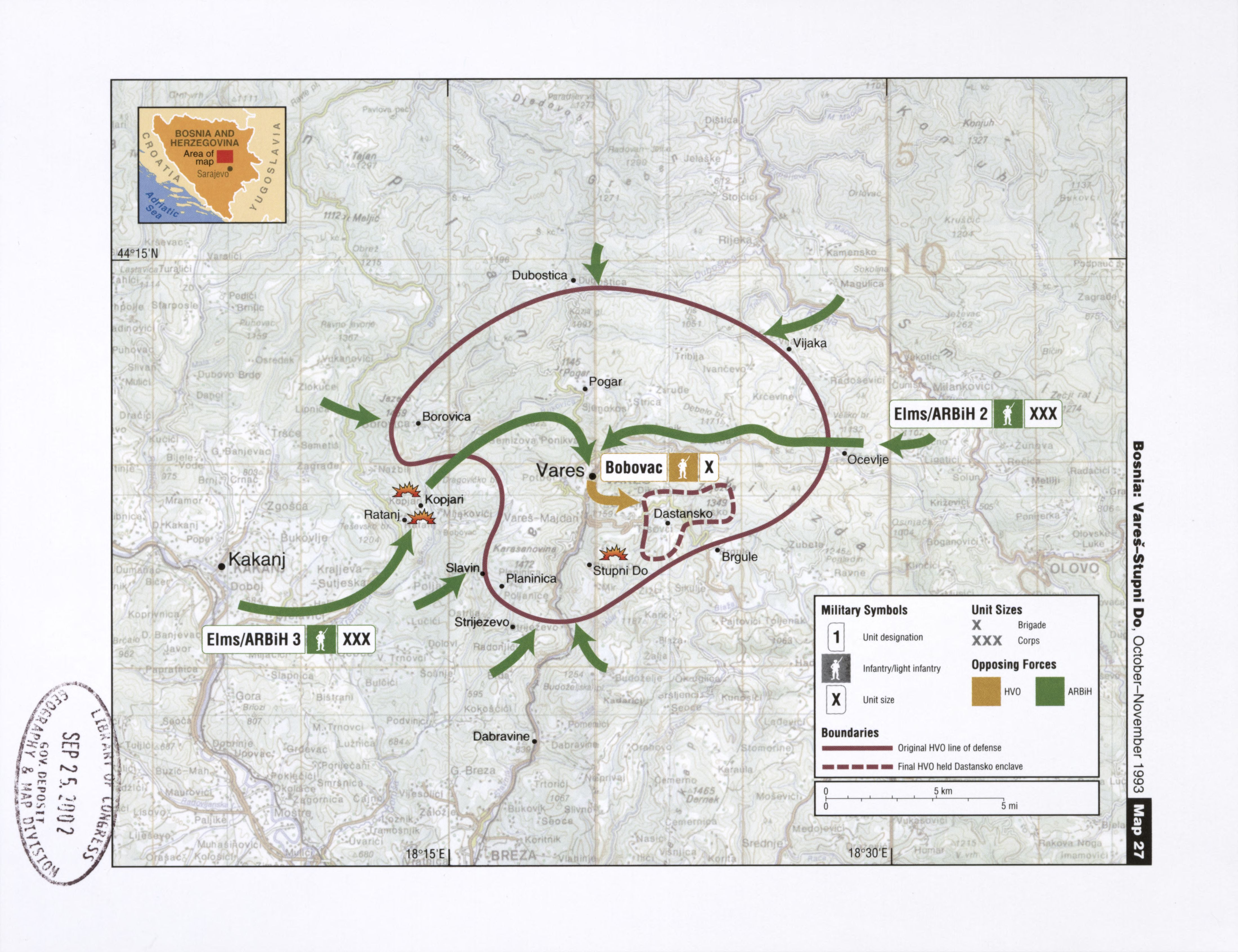
Date	23 October – 4 November 1993
Location	Vareš
Result	ARBIH victory: Croatian Defense Council keeps a stronghold in Daštansko
Territorial changes	ARBIH captured Vareš

Belligerents
Croatian Republic of Herzeg-Bosnia	Republic of Bosnia and Herzegovina

Commanders and leaders
Ivica Rajić	Hazim Šadić; Nesib Malkić †

Units involved
Croatian Defence Council: Home Guard Regiment “Bobovac”	Army of the Republic of Bosnia and Herzegovina: 2nd Corps; 3rd Corps

Casualties and losses
80 killed	Unknown

The Battle of Vareš was fought in October and early November 1993 during the Croat–Bosniak War, a phase of the Bosnian War, and resulted in the capture of the town of Vareš by the Army of the Republic of Bosnia and Herzegovina (ARBiH).

== Background ==
Vareš was a mining and metal-processing town located approximately 50 km northwest of Sarajevo, near Bosnian Serb front lines. Prior to October 1993, the town was ethnically mixed with a slight Croat majority and had largely avoided inter-ethnic violence despite heavy fighting elsewhere in central Bosnia. The town's strategic importance stemmed from its industrial capacity, road connections between Sarajevo, Breza, and Tuzla, and its proximity to Bosnian Serb territory, which facilitated extensive smuggling of goods and people across front lines.

During mid-1993, Vareš absorbed large numbers of Bosniak refugees fleeing fighting in northern and eastern Bosnia, altering the local demographic balance. At the same time, disputes emerged between the Croatian Defence Council (HVO) and the ARBiH regarding military subordination and political authority in the area.

== Escalation ==
In October 1993, hardline HVO commander Ivica Rajić arrived in Vareš from Kiseljak via Bosnian Serb-held territory. Shortly thereafter, he assumed de facto control of the enclave, removed the existing municipal leadership, and installed allies from outside the area. Reports indicate that Bosniak civilians were harassed, robbed, and driven from their homes, prompting a large-scale flight southward. Meanwhile, the ARBiH concentrated forces around the enclave. On 19 October, ARBiH units attacked Ratanj, followed by the capture of the Croat-majority village of Kopjari on 21 October, which further escalated tensions.

== Stupni Do massacre ==
On 23 October 1993, HVO forces attacked the Bosniak village of Stupni Do, located approximately 4 km south of Vareš. The village was defended by a small Territorial Defense unit with limited weaponry. The attackers destroyed all 52 houses in the village and killed a significant number of civilians. UNPROFOR forces were initially blocked from accessing the site. When Nordic Battalion troops entered the village several days later, they confirmed widespread destruction and discovered numerous civilian bodies. Estimates of those killed range from at least 23 confirmed deaths to over 60 reported by Bosniak sources. UN investigations attributed responsibility to extremist HVO elements, primarily from outside the Vareš area, particularly units linked to Ivica Rajić. While the locally based Bobovac Brigade may not have carried out the killings directly, it was reported to have obstructed UN investigations and restricted access to the site.

== ARBiH offensive and fall of Vareš ==
Following the Stupni Do massacre, ARBiH forces launched a coordinated offensive against the Vareš enclave. On 2–3 November 1993, elements of the ARBiH Second and Third Corps advanced on the town from multiple directions. HVO forces abandoned Vareš without significant resistance, retreating toward Dastansko and onward to Kiseljak. Thousands of Croat civilians fled alongside withdrawing troops. On 4 November 1993, ARBiH forces entered Vareš and established full control. Key HVO figures involved in the events were later removed from their positions, and Ivica Rajić was eventually indicted by the International Criminal Tribunal for the former Yugoslavia (ICTY) for war crimes related to Stupni Do.

Despite this the HVO fulfilled their goals. Two days later after arrival of HVO troops in Vareš, Rajić received a short and clear order from Slobodan Praljak, commander of the General Staff of the HVO, which read: "Solve the situation in Vareš without mercy towards anyone, find people who are up to the task and the time." This implies the whole goal was not just to take the town of Vareš.

== See also ==
- Stupni Do massacre
