= Battle of Žuč =

1992 battle

- Part of Siege of Sarajevo
Date	8 June 1992
Location	Sarajevo, Bosnia and Herzegovina
Result	ARBiH victory
Territorial changes	ARBiH captures Žuč

Belligerents
Army of Republika Srpska (1992–95); Volunteers and paramilitaries from Yugoslavia	Army of the Republic of Bosnia and Herzegovina

Commanders and leaders
Unknown	Mustafa Hajrulahović Talijan; Safet Zajko †; Enver Šehović †

Units involved
Army of Republika Srpska	1st Corps

Strength
Unknown	Unknown

Casualties and losses
	Unknown

The Battle of Žuč (Bosnian: Bitka za Žuč) was a strategic defensive military victory of the Army of the Republic of Bosnia and Herzegovina and the defeat of The Army of Republika Srpska that took place on the 8th June 1992 at the strategic hill of Žuč, located in the municipality of Novi Grad, Sarajevo.

== The battle ==
On 8 June 1992, the defenders of Sarajevo under the command of Enver Šehović and Safet Zajko liberated Orlić brdo and the wider area towards Volujek and Krstac, and the settlements of Smiljevići and Zabrđe in a fierce battle on Žuč Hill. The Battle of Žuč was one of the keys to the defense of Sarajevo and Bosnia and Herzegovina in aggression. On that day, the aggressor's intention to divide Sarajevo into two parts was destroyed. The goal of the ARBiH operation was to break through the encirclement and join forces with the ARBiH on the other side of the city. The plan for carrying out the operation was brought by the Chief of Staff of the Supreme Command of the ARBiH, Sefer Halilović, and the units were commanded by Mustafa Hajrulahović Talijan. The attack directions were the Žuč plateau with the elevation of Orlić, Kobilja Glava and Poljine, Kromolj and Orlovac, Gazin Han and Obhodža, Vidikovac (Trebević) and Vraca. Combat operations began at 5:00 a.m. The attack directions are the Žuč plateau with the dominant elevation of Orlić, Kobilja Glava and Poljine, Kromolj and Orlovac, Gazin Han and Obhodža, Vidikovac (Trebević), and Vraca. ARBiH breaks through the Serbian lines around Sarajevo in all directions of attack; Kromolj, Trebević, Vraca, Žuč.

== Final phase and aftermath ==
Significant amounts of weapons and ammunition, military equipment, and medical supplies were confiscated. It confirmed the ARBiH victory in the ongoing Battle of Pofalići and secured and strengthened communication with the defenders from the Vogošća area, i.e., the settlements of Ugorsko, Bušće, and Kobilja Glava. After the conquest of Orlić, Kota 850, Vis, and Golo Brdo were also captured.
