= Nesib Malkić =

Bosnian commander (1961–1993)

- Born: 5 July 1961; Dubrave Gornje, Živinice, FPRY
- Died: 25 October 1993 (aged 32); Olovo, Republic of Bosnia and Herzegovina
- Military career
- Allegiance: (Socialist Federal Republic of Yugoslavia) SFR Yugoslavia Republic of Bosnia and Herzegovina
- Branch: Army of the Republic of Bosnia and Herzegovina
- Commands: 210/281. Knight's Liberation Brigade "Nesib Malkić"
- Conflicts: Bosnian War; Majevica front; Liberation of Vareš after HVO's Stupni Do massacre †
- Awards: Order of the Golden Lily Order of the Hero of the Liberation War

Nesib Malkić (July 5, 1961 – October 25, 1993) was a Bosnian military commander in the Army of the Republic of Bosnia and Herzegovina during the Bosnian War, and also the commander of 210/281. Knight's Liberation Brigade, to which the name "Nesib Malkić" was added after his death.

== Early life ==
Nesib Malkić was born on July 15, 1961, in Dubrave Gornje, municipality of Živinice as the fifth of eight children of parents Hamdija and Ajka. In addition to Nesib, the Malkić family had 3 more sons and 4 daughters. He finished elementary school in his hometown and enrolled in high school in the former "Maršal Tito" military barracks in Sarajevo. After graduating with honors in high school, he enrolled in a higher military school - the Department of Air Force and Air Defense. In addition, he is completing specialist training in Zadar.

== War period ==
He left the former Yugoslav People's Army at the beginning of April 1992 with the rank of captain. He then placed himself at the disposal of the municipal headquarters of the Kladanj Territorial Defense. On May 9, 1992, he was assigned to the post of commander of the TO Živinice company and soon became the chief of the municipal staff of the TO Živinice. With the formation of the 210th Mountain Brigade, he became its first commander. With the formation of operational group 6 (OP-6), which was under the direct command of the Main Staff of the RBiH Army, he became the chief of staff of that OG.

== Death ==
After the Stupni Do massacre, committed by HVO units, the brigade commanded by Nesib Malkić was tasked with taking control of Vareš. He died during the preparation of this task, during the commander's reconnaissance on October 25, 1993, on the Crnoriječka visoravan.

== Legacy ==
By decree of the Presidency of RBiH, on December 6, 1993, in the same year he died, he was awarded the Order of the Golden Lily. In 1994, Nesib Malkić was posthumously awarded the Order of the Hero of the Liberation War for his heroic contribution to the defensive-liberation war, and his exceptional heroism and self-immolation. In 1996, he was posthumously promoted to the rank of brigadier in the RBiH Army. A street in Tuzla is named after him (Ulica Nesiba Malkića), and the city boulevard in Živinice (Bulevar Nesiba Malkića), too.
