= Safet Hadžić (politician) =

Bosnian politician (1953–1992)

- Born: 28 August 1952; Strgačina (Rudo), NR Bosnia and Herzegovina, FPR Yugoslavia
- Died: 18 April 1992 (aged 39); Pretis, Vogošća, Republic of Bosnia and Herzegovina
- Cause of death: Shooting
- Burial place: Martyr's Cemetery Kovači
- Spouse: Džemila
- Children: 3
- Military career
- Allegiance: (Socialist Federal Republic of Yugoslavia) SFR Yugoslavia Republic of Bosnia and Herzegovina
- Branch: Army of the Republic of Bosnia and Herzegovina
- Rank: Brigadier general (posthumously)
- Conflicts: Bosnian War; Siege of Sarajevo †
- Awards: Order of the Golden Lily (posthumously); Order of the Hero of the Liberation War (posthumously)

Safet Hadžić (August 28, 1952 – April 18, 1992) was a Bosnian politician, president of the Crisis Staff of the Sarajevo region and organizer of the resistance during the Bosnian War. He was killed in action during the seizure of weapons at the Pretis weapons factory in Vogošća. He was posthumously awarded the rank of brigadier general. He also received war awards, the Order of the Golden Lily in 1992 and the highest military decoration, the Order of the Hero of the Liberation War in 1994. He was one of the founders of the Party of Democratic Action of Sarajevo, the first president of the SDA of Novi Grad, and one of the founders of the SDA Rudo.

== Biography ==
Safet Hadžić was born in Strgačina near Rudo. Hadžić was 20 years old when his father died. Due to the poor economic situation in his hometown, he moved to Sarajevo in the 1970s, where he got a job at the Sarajevo Waterworks. He lived in Švrakino Selo. He had three children with his wife Džemila: Nezir, Almira, and Amila. Hadžić opposed the one-party system of SFR Yugoslavia because of the legal provisions on religion.

In the 1983 Sarajevo Process, where Muslim intellectuals were arrested and detained for publishing the Islamic Declaration, among whom was the future first president of the Republic of Bosnia and Herzegovina, Alija Izetbegović, Safet Hadžić organized the collection of funds to support the families of those arrested.

After the outbreak of war in Slovenia and Croatia, Hadžić was one of the founders of the Patriotic League, which was later merged into the Army of the Republic of Bosnia and Herzegovina. He gathered officers leaving the Yugoslav People's Army and included them in the Patriotic League. He had an operational headquarters from where he issued orders.

== Death ==
In early April, Sarajevo faced siege as the Yugoslav People's Army shelled the city. Despite volunteer mobilization, there was a severe shortage of weapons. One of the key actions for the defense of the city and the state occurred on the night between April 17th and 18th, 1992, when around thirty members of the Special Unit of the Ministry of Internal Affairs of the Republic of Bosnia and Herzegovina, with the assistance of joint units of the Territorial Defense, extracted a portion of the weaponry from the premises of the "Pretis" factory in Vogošća. In a very well-organized operation, without a single shot fired from 3–5 AM, the special forces of Dragan Vikić and Kemal Ademović extracted 1,100 anti-tank missiles and a truckload of mortar grenades that would later prove crucial for the defense of the city. Amidst chaos, Safet Hažić attempted to procure more arms on April 18, unaware of Serbian forces' control over the factory. During this mission, Safet and his comrades Sead Velić, Nermin Zeljković, Fahrudin Čavčić, Almir Islamović and Senad Čirić, were killed in an ambush attack. Safet Hadžić was buried in the martyr's cemetery "Kovači" in Sarajevo.

== Legacy ==
A monument to Safet Hadžić and his comrades was erected near the site of their death at the entrance to "Pretis". Additionally, a monument was dedicated to Safet Hadžić in front of the Novi Grad Municipality building in Sarajevo.

The street passing through Švrakino Selo, the neighborhood where Safet Hadžić lived, was named "Safeta Hadžića" street. In the song of the Hor Hazreti Hamza, "Za nju vrijedi umrijeti" ("She is worth dying for"), Safet Hadžić's most famous quote was inserted (at 3:50):

"Look at what our enemies are preparing for us. Mr. Milošević and Mr. Tuđman think we are the ones their predecessors played with. From here and from all our places, the message will go: 'We will give our lives for Bosnia and Herzegovina!'"

— Safet Hadžić, 1991
