= Enver Šehović =

Bosnian Army commander (1967–1993)

- Born: January 15, 1967; Foča, Socialist Federal Republic of Yugoslavia
- Died: July 27, 1993 (aged 26); Sarajevo, Republic of Bosnia and Herzegovina
- Military career
- Allegiance: Socialist Federal Republic of Yugoslavia Republic of Bosnia and Herzegovina
- Branch: Army of the Republic of Bosnia and Herzegovina
- Commands: 1. Knights Motorized Brigade
- Conflicts: Bosnian War; Siege of Sarajevo; Battle of Žuč †
- Awards: The Golden Lily Order of the Hero of the Liberation War

Enver Šehović (January 15, 1967 – July 27, 1993) was a Bosnian commander in the Army of the Republic of Bosnia and Herzegovina (ARBiH), commanding 1st Knight Motorized Brigade.

He was posthumously awarded the highest military award, the Order of the Hero of the Liberation War, and the Order of the Golden Lily.

== Early life ==
Enver Šehović, from father Zahid and mother Iša, was born on January 15, 1967, in the village of Bujakovina, municipality of Foča. He finished elementary school in his hometown. At 15, after completing elementary school, he came to Sarajevo, where he enrolled in the 31st KoV Secondary Military School in the Marshal Tito barracks in Sarajevo. After finishing high school, he goes to Belgrade, where he enters the Military Academy. After that, he returned to the "Maršal Tito" barracks, where since 1988 he has been working as a lieutenant training new generations of JNA cadets at the Training Center.

== War period ==
After leaving the JNA, on April 6, 1992, he joined the Army of the Republic of Bosnia and Herzegovina and formed a military unit in the Sarajevo neighborhood of Velešići. At the beginning of July 1992, he commanded the 13th Novo Sarajevo Brigade. On September 1, 1992, the brigade changed its name to the 1st Mechanized Brigade, and Enver Šehović remained the commander of the newly formed brigade. In the consolidation phase of units of the RBiH Army, with the 1st Mechanized and 12th Mountain Brigades merger, he became the commander of the newly formed 1st Motorized Brigade. After successfully performing high command duties, he made a name for himself by commanding the 1st Slavna (later Viteška) motorized brigade. He died on July 27, 1993, during the fighting for Golo Brdo on Žuč. He was buried in the harem of Alipaša's mosque in Sarajevo.

== Legacy ==
Enver Šehović Street in Dolac Malta neighborhood in Sarajevo is named after him.
