= Zaseok =

Zaseok may refer to the following places in Bosnia and Herzegovina :

- Zaseok, Bosansko Grahovo
- Zaseok, Sapna
