= Safet Zajko =

Bosnian brigadier general (1959–1993)

- Born: 1 March 1959; Rudo, Socialist Federal Republic of Yugoslavia
- Died: 17 June 1993 (aged 34); Sarajevo, Republic of Bosnia and Herzegovina
- Military career
- Allegiance: Socialist Federal Republic of Yugoslavia Republic of Bosnia and Herzegovina
- Branch: Army of the Republic of Bosnia and Herzegovina
- Rank: Brigadier general (posthumously)
- Conflicts: Bosnian War; Siege of Sarajevo; Battle of Žuč †
- Awards: The Golden Lily Order of the Hero of the Liberation War

Safet Zajko (March 1, 1959 – June 17, 1993) was a Bosnian brigadier general, a member of the Army of the Republic of Bosnia and Herzegovina. He was awarded the Order of the Golden Lily and the Order of the Hero of the Liberation War.

== Pre-war period ==
Safet Zajko was born on March 1. 1959 in the village of Gaočić, northwest of Rudo, from father Salko and mother Duda. After finishing high school, as a metalworker by profession, he was employed at the metal processing company Zrak from Vogošća. He completed training at the Reserve Infantry Officers School in Bileća. Before the Bosnian War, he held the rank of reserve captain. At the beginning of 1992, he started working on organizing and preparing armed resistance in the Sarajevo settlements of Buća Potok, Buljakov Potok, Briješće, Sokolje, Pofalići, Velešići, where Territorial Defense units were being formed. Until the beginning of the war, Safet continued to work on organizing and preparing armed resistance in this part of Sarajevo. He coordinated the work of the newly formed military units in Sarajevo municipality of Novi Grad and worked on their integration.

== War period ==
On May 19, 1992, the First Independent Battalion of the District Defense Headquarters Sarajevo and the 15th Infantry Brigade TO Novi Grad, formed on July 1, 1992, were formed from already formed units from this area. On October 1, 1992, with further consolidation of units and organizational structure improvement, the 2nd Motorized Brigade was formed, headed by Safet Zajko.

== Death ==
Only 5 days after the liberation of Mijatovića Kosa, on the Žuč hill, on June 17, 1993, he was killed while scouting the position. Safet's wife and two daughters survived him. He was buried as a martyr in the harem of Alipaša's mosque in Sarajevo.

== Awards ==
For war exploits, by order of the commander of the General Staff of the RBiH Army number 02-/1091-451 dated 15 December 1992, he was awarded the Golden Lily as one of the first recipients of this award. For his heroic contribution to the war of defense and liberation, exceptional heroism, and self-sacrifice in combat and achieved results, he was posthumously awarded the Order of the Hero of the Liberation War of the Army of the Republic of Bosnia and Herzegovina. By the decision of the Presidency of the Republic of Bosnia and Herzegovina No. 02-111-35/96 of January 12, 1996, he was posthumously promoted to the rank of Brigadier general.

In Sarajevo, there is a street "Safeta Zajke" (Street of Safet Zajko), and a park named "Park Safet Zajko", both located in the municipality of Novi Grad, Sarajevo.
