= Safet Hadžić =

Safet Hadžić may refer to:

- Safet Hadžić (footballer), Slovenian footballer and manager
- Safet Hadžić (politician), Bosnian politician
