= Special Police Squad "Bosna" =

- Odred specijalne policije "Bosna"
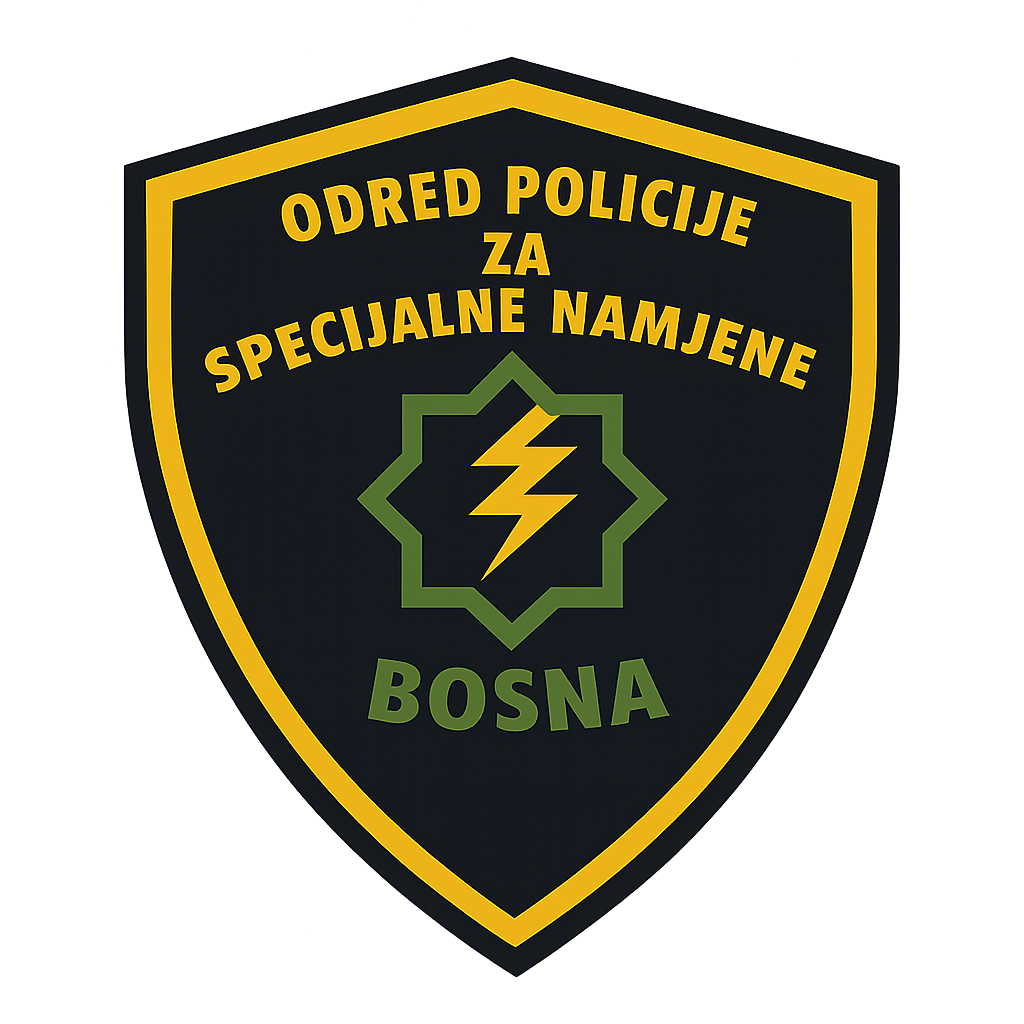
- Active: 1992–1995
- Disbanded: 1995
- Country: Bosnia and Herzegovina
- Type: Special Forces
- Role: Special reconnaissance Direct action
- Part of: Army of the Republic of Bosnia and Herzegovina
- Garrison/HQ: Sarajevo
- Colors
- March: Vojnik sreće (Soldier of Fortune)
- Engagements: Bosnian War; Siege of Sarajevo

Commanders
- Notable commanders: Dragan Vikić; Kemal Ademović

Insignia
- Identification symbol: Lightning strike Rub el Hizb

Special Police Squad "Bosna" was a special forces unit of the Ministry of Interior of the Republic of Bosnia and Herzegovina and a part of the Army of the Republic of Bosnia and Herzegovina, the official military of the wartime government of Bosnia.

== History ==
The special unit of the Ministry of Interior grew out of the pre-war Republican special unit established in 1982. Like most European police special units, which were created in response to the tide of terrorism, this unit was formed from the above-average age of police officers, modernly equipped, and specially trained and to be ready to effectively act against terrorism.

On 6 April 1992, during mass peace demonstrations outside the Bosnian Parliament in Sarajevo, snipers from the Serb Democratic Party positioned in the adjacent Holiday Inn opened fire on an unarmed crowd. Enraged by the sniper fire, a group of protestors alongside the Special Police Squad "Bosna" led by Dragan Vikić, who were present to secure the rally, stormed the hotel lobby to neutralize the threat and apprehend the gunmen. Later on, the unit played a key role in the defense of Sarajevo during the siege. Some of the heaviest battles were fought by the unit, most battles ended in their favor which gained them enormous popularity. The members of the unit were informally called Vikićevi, meaning "the guys from commander Dragan Vikić."

The unit was mostly under the direct command of the presidency of the Republic of Bosnia and Herzegovina.
