= Mehdin Hodžić =

- Born: 15 October 1957; Tuzla, SFR Yugoslavia
- Died: 10 May 1992 (aged 34); Zaseok, Sapna, Republic of Bosnia and Herzegovina
- Military career
- Allegiance: (Socialist Federal Republic of Yugoslavia) SFR Yugoslavia Republic of Bosnia and Herzegovina
- Branch: Army of the Republic of Bosnia and Herzegovina
- Nicknames: Kapetan Senad (Captain Senad); Crni labud (Black swan)
- Commands: Black Swans (Crni labudovi)
- Conflicts: Bosnian War; Liberation of Sapna 1992 †
- Awards: Order of the Golden Lily; Order of the Hero of the Liberation War

Mehdin Hodžić aka Kapetan Senad (October 15, 1957 – May 10, 1992) was a Bosnian military officer and a member of the Army of the Republic of Bosnia and Herzegovina. He was posthumously awarded the Order of Hero of the Liberation War and the Order of the Golden Lily. He was also called Kapetan Labud (Captain Swan) or Crni labud (Black Swan) while commanding the special forces Black Swans.

== Biography ==
Mehdin Hodžić was born in Tuzla on October 15, 1957, in the family of father Selmo and mother Hurija. He spent his childhood in the Tuzla settlement Šićki Brod. After completing primary and secondary education in his native region, he enrolled in the Faculty of Sports in Sarajevo. In the period before the war in Bosnia and Herzegovina, he worked as a policeman in Split.

=== War period ===
With the start of the war in Croatia, he left Croatia and came to Bosnia and Herzegovina at the end of 1991. During that period, he joined the Patriotic League and organized defense in northeastern Bosnia. On April 25, 1992, in the free part of the municipality of Zvornik, in Sapna, he assumed the duties of the commander of the TG Territorial Defense of Zvornik. Together with another recipient of the Order of Heroes of the Liberation War, Hajrudin Mešić, he organizes the defense of the Zvornik area. He died on May 10, 1992, in a battle near the village of Zaseok, near Sapna.
