= Midhad Hujdur =

Bosnian Soldier (1953–1993)

- Born: 28 December 1953; Mostar, SR Bosnia and Herzegovina, SFR Yugoslavia
- Died: 30 June 1993 (aged 39); Mostar, Bosnia and Herzegovina
- Military career
- Allegiance: (Socialist Federal Republic of Yugoslavia) SFR Yugoslavia Republic of Bosnia and Herzegovina
- Branch: Army of the Republic of Bosnia and Herzegovina
- Commands: 41st Glorious Brigade
- Conflicts: Bosnian War; 1993 Deblockade of Mostar †
- Awards: Order of the Golden Lily Order of the Hero of the Liberation War

Midhad Hujdur aka Hujka (December 28, 1953 – June 30, 1993) was a member of the Army of the Republic of Bosnia and Herzegovina. In the First Mostar Brigade, whose commander was Arif Pašalić, Hujdur commanded a battalion numbering 1,200 fighters. When Pašalić was appointed commander of the 4th Corps, Hujdur took command of the brigade, which would later become the 41st Glorious Brigade. He was killed on June 30, 1993, in the action to unblock Mostar and was buried at the Martyrs Cemetery in Mostar.

He was posthumously awarded the Order of the Golden Lily and the Order of the Hero of the Liberation War of the Army of the Republic of Bosnia and Herzegovina.

== Biography ==
He was born on December 28, 1953, in the neighborhood Luka in Mostar, as the son of father Husnija and mother Bahrija. After his parents' divorce, he lost his father and mother, and he and his two brothers, Mirsad and Jasmin, were raised by their aunt Šefika.
