= 1992 anti-war protests in Sarajevo =

1992 protests in Sarajevo, Bosnia and Herzegovina

Anti-war protests in Sarajevo
- Part of the Siege of Sarajevo and the Bosnian War
- Thousands of protesters in front of the parliament building.
- Date: 5–6 April 1992
- Location: Sarajevo, Republic of Bosnia and Herzegovina
- Caused by: Bosnian Serb barricades set up around Sarajevo; Opposition to Serbian nationalist militias; Opposition to the Izetbegović government
- Goals: Military withdrawal of the JNA forces and SDS paramilitary troops from Bosnia and Herzegovina; Resignation of the government
- Methods: Demonstrations; Protests
- Result: Beginning of Bosnian War

Parties
(Socialist Republic of Bosnia and Herzegovina) Protestors	Government of Bosnia and Herzegovina; (Republika Srpska) SDS paramilitary forces

Lead figures
No centralized leadership	(Bosnia and Herzegovina) Alija Izetbegović (Republika Srpska) Radovan Karadžić

Number
100,000 protesters	6 snipers

Casualties and losses
Olga Sučić, Suada Dilberović, 4 more	Unknown

Casualties
- Injuries: 50 injuries
- Arrested: 6 Serb paramilitary members in the "Holiday Inn" hotel

On 5 April 1992, in response to events all over Bosnia and Herzegovina 100,000 people of all nationalities turned out for a peace rally in Sarajevo. Serb Democratic Party (SDS) snipers in the Holiday Inn in the heart of Sarajevo opened fire on the crowd, killing six people and wounding several more. Suada Dilberović and an ethnic Croat woman Olga Sučić were in the first rows, protesting on the Vrbanja bridge at the time. The bridge on which Sučić and Dilberović were killed was later renamed in their honor. Six SDS snipers were arrested, but were exchanged when the SDS threatened to kill the commander of the Bosnian police academy who had been captured the previous day, after the Serb paramilitaries took over the academy and arrested him.

== Storming of the parliament building ==
The protesters stormed into the parliament building where they founded the so-called "Narodni parliament" (People's parliament), and where they offered everybody to make a two-minute speech on what should be done next in solving the siege problem. Many famous Sarajevans spoke to the full parliament main hall. The president of the Republic of Bosnia and Herzegovina, Alija Izetbegović also appeared and presented himself, to the crowd, as more of a citizen rather than a president, which brought loud cheering and applause. This is despite the fact that, in February 1992, Alija claimed that "[He] would sacrifice peace for a sovereign Bosnia-Herzegovina". The atmosphere was at its highest point when the commander of the Special forces unit of the Ministry of Interior, Dragan Vikić appeared and told the audience: "To arm against the Serbian aggression".

== Legacy ==
It is disputed between Bosniaks, Croats and Serbs who the first casualties of the Bosnian War are. Bosniaks and Croats consider the first casualties of the war to be Suada Dilberović and Olga Sučić. Serbs consider Nikola Gardović, a groom's father who was killed at a Serb wedding procession on the second day of the referendum, on 1 March 1992 in Sarajevo's old town Baščaršija, to be the first victim of the war.

Testimony provided by former JNA General Aleksandar Vasiljević during the Slobodan Milosevic war crimes trial in the Hague contradicts the allegation that it was Serbian snipers who opened fire.

== See also ==
- 1991–1992 anti-war protests in Belgrade
- Concert Yutel for Peace
