= Sarajevo barricades =

Sarajevo Barricades Incident
- Part of the Bosnian War and Breakup of Yugoslavia
- Date: March 1–3, 1992
- Location: Sarajevo, Socialist Republic of Bosnia and Herzegovina; 43.8563°N 18.4131°E
- Caused by: 1992 Bosnian independence referendum; Sarajevo wedding attack (immediate trigger)
- Goals: SDS: Partition of Sarajevo police and territory; halting independence recognition; Government: Restore state control and removing blockades
- Methods: Barricades, armed checkpoints, sniper fire, psychological intimidation
- Result: Barricades dismantled after political agreement; Establishment of "Mixed Patrols" (JNA and MUP); De facto partition of city security; Precursor to the Siege of Sarajevo

Parties
(Socialist Federal Republic of Yugoslavia) SDS Crisis Staffs; JNA (covert support)	(Socialist Republic of Bosnia and Herzegovina) MUP of SR BiH; Patriotic League (Green Berets)

Lead figures
Radovan Karadžić; Momčilo Krajišnik; Rajko Dukić	Alija Izetbegović; Dragan Vikić

Casualties and losses
Unknown	Confirmed deaths: Ramo Biber; Kenan Demirović

Casualties
- Deaths: 2+

The Sarajevo Barricades Incident (Rat barikada, "War of the Barricades") refers to the erection of roadblocks and the seizure of strategic points in Sarajevo by paramilitary forces of the Serbian Democratic Party (SDS) between March 1 and March 3, 1992. Occurring immediately after the Bosnian independence referendum, the event paralyzed the capital of the Socialist Republic of Bosnia and Herzegovina.

While the SDS leadership initially claimed the barricades were a spontaneous reaction to the shooting of a Serbian groom's father in Baščaršija, subsequent findings by the International Criminal Tribunal for the former Yugoslavia (ICTY) described the event as a planned operation. The tribunal characterized the incident as a "general rehearsal" for the Siege of Sarajevo, designed to test the deployment of the SDS "Crisis Staffs" and the partition of the city's security apparatus.

== Background ==
=== "Variant A/B" Instructions ===
According to evidence presented at the ICTY trials of Radovan Karadžić and Momčilo Krajišnik, the organization of the barricades was grounded in a secret document issued by the SDS Main Board on December 19, 1991, titled "Instructions for the Organization and Activity of Organs of the Serbian People in Bosnia and Herzegovina in Extraordinary Circumstances". This directive, known as "Variant A/B", outlined two modes of taking power:

Variant A (Full Takeover): In municipalities with a Serb majority (e.g., Ilidža, Vogošća, Pale), SDS forces were to seize full control of state institutions, police stations, and infrastructure.

Variant B (Parallel Institutions): In municipalities where Serbs were a minority (e.g., Sarajevo's center), officials were to withdraw from joint institutions and establish parallel "Crisis Staffs" to partition the territory.

=== The Trigger: Wedding Shooting ===
On March 1, 1992, the final day of the independence referendum, a Serbian wedding procession was fired upon in the Baščaršija district. Nikola Gardović, the groom's father, was killed, and a Serbian Orthodox priest was wounded. The perpetrator was identified as Ramiz Delalić, a local figure with ties to the underworld and the nascent Bosniak paramilitary groups.

Although the shooting was a criminal act, the SDS leadership, operating from the Holiday Inn, immediately characterized it as a collective threat to the Serbian people. Rajko Dukić, President of the SDS Executive Board, utilized the incident to justify the mobilization of the Crisis Staffs.

== The Barricades (March 1–3) ==
By the evening of March 1 and the morning of March 2, heavily armed individuals wearing stocking masks erected barricades at key transit points throughout Sarajevo. The operation effectively bisected the city and isolated the Parliament and Presidency buildings.

=== Strategic Deployment ===
The placement of barricades corresponded to the strategic objectives of isolating the city center:

Internal Blockades: Major intersections at Marijin Dvor and Pofalići were blocked, cutting the main east–west artery ("Sniper Alley") and separating the Old Town from the new municipalities.

Perimeter Control: The suburban municipalities of Vogošća (north), Ilidža (west), and Lapišnica (east) were sealed off, demonstrating the capacity for a total siege.

International monitor Col. Colm Doyle (ECMM) testified that he negotiated passage through eight separate barricades on March 2, noting that the personnel were disciplined, armed with automatic weapons, and communicated via radio, contradicting claims of spontaneous unrest.

=== Casualties ===
The incident resulted in the first verified casualties of the conflict in Sarajevo, often cited as targeted killings to secure strategic positions:

Ramo Biber (March 2, 1992): A guard at the Trebević Cable Car. He was killed by paramilitary forces securing the summit of Trebević, a dominant high ground that would later host the main artillery batteries shelling the city.

Kenan Demirović (March 2, 1992): An 18-year-old killed in Vogošća (Kobilja Glava), marking the violent takeover of this "Variant A" municipality.

== Resolution and Aftermath ==
Negotiations were held between President Alija Izetbegović, SDS leader Radovan Karadžić, and JNA General Milutin Kukanjac.

=== "Mixed Patrols" Agreement ===
On March 3, an agreement was reached to dismantle the barricades in exchange for the deployment of "Mixed Patrols" consisting of JNA soldiers and the Bosnian police (MUP). While publicly presented as a peace-restoring measure, analysts and the ICTY later noted that this agreement allowed the JNA (already aligning with the SDS) to legally deploy units within the city and conduct reconnaissance of the city's defenses.

The barricades were dismantled simultaneously upon the order of the SDS leadership, which international observers cited as proof of strict command and control over the "spontaneous" rebels.

== Significance ==
The event is regarded by the ICTY as a "general rehearsal" for the siege that began formally on April 6, 1992. It achieved several objectives for the SDS:

- Testing logistics: Verified the responsiveness of the Crisis Staffs and communication networks.
- Strategic mapping: Identified the choke points necessary to divide the city.
- Psychological impact: Introduced the presence of masked, armed paramilitaries to the civilian population.

== See also ==
- Siege of Sarajevo
- 1992 Bosnian independence referendum
- Ramiz Delalić
