= Adil Bešić =

Bosnian military officer (1964–1992)

- Born: 5 April 1964; Banja Luka, Socialist Federal Republic of Yugoslavia
- Died: 28 November 1992 (aged 28); Bihać, Republic of Bosnia and Herzegovina
- Military career
- Allegiance: Bosnia and Herzegovina
- Commands: 2nd Battalion, 502nd Knights Mountain Brigade
- Awards: Order of the Golden Lily; Order of the Hero of the Liberation War

Adil Bešić (5 April 1964 – 28 November 1992) was a Bosnian military officer in the Army of the Republic of Bosnia and Herzegovina.

He started his military career in the Yugoslav People's Army as an officer, and from 1992 he was a member of the Territorial Defense of Bihać. As the commander of the 2nd battalion of the 502nd famous mountain brigade of the Fifth Corps (5. Korpus), he died on 28 November 1992, in the Grabež region while performing a combat mission. He was posthumously awarded the Golden Lily and the Order of the Hero of the Liberation War of the Army of the Republic of Bosnia and Herzegovina.

== Early life ==
He was born in Banja Luka on 5 April 1964. He was named after his mother, Adila, who died 8 days after his birth. He grew up in a family originating from the Prijedor neighborhood of Kozarac, which consisted of his father Adem, stepmother Bahrija, and brothers: the elder Nihad and two younger brothers Ilijaz and Izet.

Soon after his birth, in 1964, the Bešić family moved from Kozarac to Prijedor, where Adil finished elementary school. In 1978, as an excellent student, he went to Zagreb, where he entered the Military High School, after which he continued his education at the Military Academy, majoring in the Army. He attended the first two years of the military academy in Sarajevo, and the remaining two years of study in Belgrade, where he graduated.

== Military career ==
After graduating from the Military Academy, he continued his career in the JNA, as an officer. His office was originally located in Tolmin, Slovenia. Over time, he proves himself a promising officer. He completes a course for JNA reconnaissance units, after which he works as an intelligence agent in the border area, on the state triple border, between the former Yugoslavia, Austria, and Italy.

With the declaration of Slovenia's independence and the beginning of the Ten-Day War, the JNA unit he served was located on the Yugoslav border, in Nova Gorica. After the JNA withdrew from the territory of Slovenia, the JNA unit in which Adil Bešić was on 29 August 1991, together with about 100 vehicles was stationed in Bihać. Part of that unit, in which Adil was also, was transferred to Plitvice, over which JNA forces took control on 31 March 1991.

After the start of the war in Bosnia and Herzegovina, he left the JNA. He then joined the Territorial Defense of RBiH in Bihać, where he took command of the Territorial Defense Detachment "Gata-Vrsta".

== War period ==
After taking command of the TO "Gata-Vrsta" Detachment, Adil Bešić, as a professional military person, established a military organization and, through his activities in the Detachment, asked his subordinates to professionally perform the tasks entrusted to them while strictly punishing all illegal actions and respecting the Geneva Conventions.

The first significant event under the command of Adil Bešić took place on 12 June 1992, when, in an organized action, the TO "Vrsta" units liberated the populated place of Bulgar and went to the state border with Croatia.

In the next period, the Detachment preserved the defense lines and reached the Serbian Plateau and other defense lines around Bihać.

With the formation of the 2nd Bihać Brigade (502nd Knight's Mountain Brigade), Adil Bešić became the commander of its 2nd battalion.

== Death ==
In November 1992, the forces led by Bešić liberated Lohovska Brda. After the successes achieved in the Grabež region, he was killed on 28 November 1992, as the commander of the 2nd Battalion of the then 2nd Bihać Brigade, while performing a combat mission.

== Legacy ==
The barracks in Bihać used as HQ of the 5th Corps were named after him after his death (Bosnian: Kasarna “Adil Bešić”), and they still exist today under that name, used by the Armed Forces of Bosnia and Herzegovina.
