= Zaseok, Sapna =

Zaseok
- Village
- Location within Bosnia and Herzegovina
- Coordinates: 44.4667434°N 19.008944°E
- Country: Bosnia and Herzegovina
- Entity: Federation of Bosnia and Herzegovina
- Canton: Tuzla
- Municipality: Sapna

Area
  - Total: 0.88 sq mi (2.29 km^{2})

Population (2013)
  - Total: 1,110
  - Density: 1,260/sq mi (485/km^{2})

Zaseok is a village in the municipality of Sapna, Bosnia and Herzegovina. Located in between Sapna and Križevići (Zvornik), it is a small, quiet, rural village that is typical of northeastern Bosnia and Herzegovina. The economy of the village is mainly driven by agriculture and livestock, but also partially from funds made by the diaspora (most of which were forced out of their homes during the Bosnian War) who live and work abroad to support their families still remaining here. General Mehdin "Kapetan Senad" Hodžić, who cofounded and commanded the famous and decorated special forces unit Crni Labudovi of ARBiH, is from Zaseok. The first VRS tank was also captured here on May 10 1992. There is also Skriveni Vodopad, a naturally made waterfall.

== Demographics ==
According to the 2013 census, its population was 1,110.

Ethnicity in 2013
Ethnicity	Number	Percentage
Bosniaks	1,097	98.8%
Croats	1	0.1%
other/undeclared	12	1.1%
Total	1,110	100%
