= Ljubina-Poturovići =

- Village
- Location within Bosnia and Herzegovina
- Country: Bosnia and Herzegovina
- Entity: Federation of Bosnia and Herzegovina
- Canton: Sarajevo
- Municipality: Vogošća

Area
  - Total: 0.95 sq mi (2.46 km^{2})

Population (2013)
  - Total: 426
  - Density: 449/sq mi (173/km^{2})
- Time zone: UTC+1 (CET)
  - Summer (DST): UTC+2 (CEST)

Ljubina-Poturovići is a village in Vogošća municipality, near Sarajevo, Federation of Bosnia and Herzegovina, Bosnia and Herzegovina.

== Demographics ==
According to the 2013 census, its population was 426.

Ethnicity in 2013
Ethnicity	Number	Percentage
Bosniaks	382	89.7%
Serbs	27	6.3%
Croats	9	2.1%
other/undeclared	8	1.9%
Total	426	100%
