= Kamenica (Vogošća) =

- Village
- Location within Bosnia and Herzegovina
- Coordinates: 43°58′08″N 18°21′06″E
- Country: Bosnia and Herzegovina
- Entity: Federation of Bosnia and Herzegovina
- Canton: Sarajevo
- Municipality: Vogošća

Area
  - Total: 2.91 sq mi (7.53 km^{2})

Population (2013)
  - Total: 98
  - Density: 34/sq mi (13/km^{2})
- Time zone: UTC+1 (CET)
  - Summer (DST): UTC+2 (CEST)

Kamenica is a village in Vogošća municipality, near Sarajevo, Federation of Bosnia and Herzegovina, Bosnia and Herzegovina.

== Demographics ==
According to the 2013 census, its population was 98.

Ethnicity in 2013
Ethnicity	Number	Percentage
Bosniaks	64	65.3%
Croats	26	26.5%
Serbs	1	1.0%
other/undeclared	7	7.1%
Total	98	100%
