= Vrapče (Vogošća) =

- Village
- Location within Bosnia and Herzegovina
- Coordinates: 43°56′N 18°24′E
- Country: Bosnia and Herzegovina
- Entity: Federation of Bosnia and Herzegovina
- Canton: Sarajevo
- Municipality: Vogošća

Area
  - Total: 0.86 sq mi (2.22 km^{2})

Population (2013)
  - Total: 0
  - Density: 0.0/sq mi (0.0/km^{2})
- Time zone: UTC+1 (CET)
  - Summer (DST): UTC+2 (CEST)

Vrapče is a village in Vogošća municipality, near Sarajevo, Federation of Bosnia and Herzegovina, Bosnia and Herzegovina.

== Demographics ==
According to the 2013 census, its population was nil, down from 59 in 1991.
