= Gora (Vogošća) =

- Village
- Location within Bosnia and Herzegovina
- Coordinates: 43°57′12″N 18°20′21″E
- Country: Bosnia and Herzegovina
- Entity: Federation of Bosnia and Herzegovina
- Canton: Sarajevo
- Municipality: Vogošća

Area
  - Total: 2.32 sq mi (6.00 km^{2})

Population (2013)
  - Total: 281
  - Density: 121/sq mi (46.8/km^{2})
- Time zone: UTC+1 (CET)
  - Summer (DST): UTC+2 (CEST)

Gora is a village in Vogošća municipality, near Sarajevo, Federation of Bosnia and Herzegovina, Bosnia and Herzegovina.

== Demographics ==
According to the 2013 census, its population was 281.

Ethnicity in 2013
| Ethnicity | Number | Percentage |
|---|---|---|
| Bosniaks | 265 | 94.3% |
| Serbs | 9 | 2.1% |
| Croats | 6 | 3.2% |
| other/undeclared | 1 | 0.4% |
| Total | 281 | 100% |
