= Donja Vogošća =

- Village
- Location within Bosnia and Herzegovina
- Coordinates: 43°56′N 18°18′E
- Country: Bosnia and Herzegovina
- Entity: Federation of Bosnia and Herzegovina
- Canton: Sarajevo
- Municipality: Vogošća

Area
  - Total: 0.24 sq mi (0.61 km^{2})

Population (2013)
  - Total: 406
  - Density: 1,700/sq mi (670/km^{2})
- Time zone: UTC+1 (CET)
  - Summer (DST): UTC+2 (CEST)

Donja Vogošća is a village in Vogošća municipality, near Sarajevo, Federation of Bosnia and Herzegovina, Bosnia and Herzegovina.

== Demographics ==
According to the 2013 census, its population was 406.

Ethnicity in 2013
Ethnicity	Number	Percentage
Bosniaks	333	82.0%
Serbs	19	4.7%
Croats	1	0.2%
other/undeclared	53	13.1%
Total	406	100%
