= Perca (Vogošća) =

- Village
- Location within Bosnia and Herzegovina
- Coordinates: 43°57′13″N 18°28′40″E
- Country: Bosnia and Herzegovina
- Entity: Federation of Bosnia and Herzegovina
- Canton: Sarajevo
- Municipality: Vogošća

Area
  - Total: 1.12 sq mi (2.89 km^{2})

Population (2013)
  - Total: 0
  - Density: 0.0/sq mi (0.0/km^{2})
- Time zone: UTC+1 (CET)
  - Summer (DST): UTC+2 (CEST)

Perca is a village in Vogošća municipality, near Sarajevo, Federation of Bosnia and Herzegovina, Bosnia and Herzegovina.

== Demographics ==
According to the 2013 census, the village did not have any population. The population was 8 in 1991.
