= Nebočaj =

- Village
- Location within Bosnia and Herzegovina
- Coordinates: 43°56′N 18°18′E
- Country: Bosnia and Herzegovina
- Entity: Federation of Bosnia and Herzegovina
- Canton: Sarajevo
- Municipality: Vogošća

Area
  - Total: 0.86 sq mi (2.24 km^{2})

Population (2013)
  - Total: 424
  - Density: 490/sq mi (189/km^{2})
- Time zone: UTC+1 (CET)
  - Summer (DST): UTC+2 (CEST)

Nebočaj is a village in Vogošća municipality, near Sarajevo, Federation of Bosnia and Herzegovina, Bosnia and Herzegovina. The village is close to the Bosna River.

== Demographics ==
According to the 2013 census, its population was 424.

Ethnicity in 2013
Ethnicity	Number	Percentage
Bosniaks	342	80.7%
Serbs	15	3.5%
Croats	4	0.9%
other/undeclared	63	14.9%
Total	424	100%
