= Blagovac =

- Village
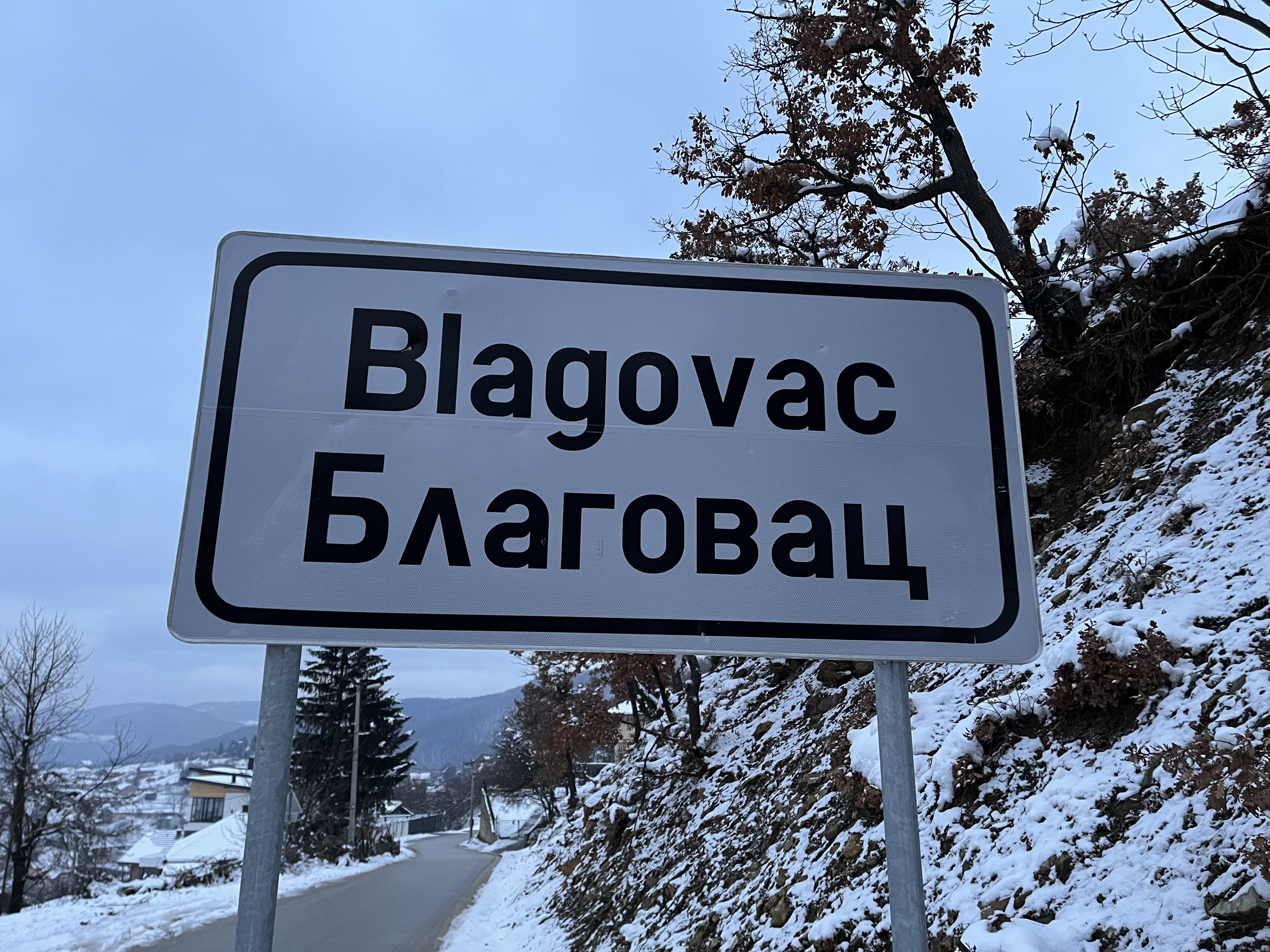

- Location within Bosnia and Herzegovina
- Coordinates: 43°55′N 18°22′E
- Country: Bosnia and Herzegovina
- Entity: Federation of Bosnia and Herzegovina
- Canton: Sarajevo
- Municipality: Vogošća

Area
  - Total: 0.68 sq mi (1.77 km^{2})

Population (2013)
  - Total: 1,956
  - Density: 2,860/sq mi (1,110/km^{2})
- Time zone: UTC+1 (CET)
  - Summer (DST): UTC+2 (CEST)

Blagovac is a settlement in Vogošća municipality, near Sarajevo, Federation of Bosnia and Herzegovina, Bosnia and Herzegovina.

It is divided into five sub parts which are: Blagovac 1 (factory area), Blagovac 2 (international dog training center in Miro Dukić's house), Blagovac 3 (local mosque that was built after the Bosnian War, shopping center and local community center) and Blagovac 4 and 5.

== History ==
The first settlers in Blagovac were the Blagovčanin and Todorovic families. Before the Bosnian conflict, Blagovac was mainly populated by Serbs. After the war, and with the forming of Republika Srpska, most of the Serbs sold their houses and moved to Pale or other places with a Serbian majority. Now Blagovac is mainly populated by Muslims, with only a few Serbian families left.

== Population ==
=== Ethnic composition, 1991 census ===
- Serbs – 1,159 (90.97%)
- Yugoslavs – 50 (3.92%)
- Croats – 27 (2.11%)
- Muslims – 16 (1.25%)
- Others and unknown – 22 (1.72%)
- Total – 1,274

=== 2013 census ===
- Serbs – 64 (3.3%)
- Croats – 15 (0.8%)
- Bosniaks – 1,842 (94.2%)
- Others and unknown – 35 (1.8%)
- Total – 1,956
