= Garež =

- Village
- Location within Bosnia and Herzegovina
- Coordinates: 43°56′07″N 18°20′20″E
- Country: Bosnia and Herzegovina
- Entity: Federation of Bosnia and Herzegovina
- Canton: Sarajevo
- Municipality: Vogošća

Area
  - Total: 0.12 sq mi (0.32 km^{2})

Population (2013)
  - Total: 22
  - Density: 180/sq mi (69/km^{2})
- Time zone: UTC+1 (CET)
  - Summer (DST): UTC+2 (CEST)

Garež is a village in the Vogošća municipality, near Sarajevo, in the Federation of Bosnia and Herzegovina, Bosnia and Herzegovina.

== Demographics ==
According to the 2013 census, the population was 22, all Bosniaks.
