= Order of the Hero of the Liberation War =

Military decoration

Order of the Hero of the Liberation War Orden heroja oslobodilačkog rata
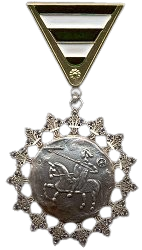

Awarded by Army of the Republic of Bosnia and Herzegovina
- Type: State order
- Established: 1994
- Country: Republic of Bosnia and Herzegovina; Bosnia and Herzegovina
- Eligibility: Citizens of the Republic of Bosnia and Herzegovina
- Criteria: "For heroic contribution to the liberation war, exceptional bravery and self-sacrifice shown in combat and thereby achieved outstanding results that served as an example, encouragement, and additional motivation for further successful resistance against the aggressor in Bosnia and Herzegovina."
- Status: Defunct
- Website: mcsarajevo.ba/muzej-heroja

Statistics
- First induction: 14 April 1994
- Last induction: 1998 (Izet Nanić)
- Total inductees: 9

Precedence
- Next (higher): None
- Next (lower): Order of the Golden Lily

The Order of the Hero of the Liberation War (Bosnian: Orden heroja oslobodilačkog rata) was the highest military decoration of the Army of the Republic of Bosnia and Herzegovina during the Bosnian War. Nine members of the Army of the Republic of Bosnia and Herzegovina were awarded the honor posthumously. Under the same conditions, the Order could have been received by military units and institutions.

The medal is made of metal: silver Ag 999/1000, gold-plated with Au 24kt, and has 45 sapphires. The dimensions of the order are approx. 100×60mm.

== Order ==
Based on amendment LI, point 5, paragraph 3, to the Constitution of the Republic of BiH and Article 4 of the Decree with legal force on decorations of the Republic of BiH (Official Gazette of the Republic of BiH, No. 9/94), this order was awarded:

"For the heroic contribution to the war of liberation, exceptional heroism and self-sacrifice manifested in combat actions, and at the same time achieved exceptional results that served as an example, incentive and additional motive for the comrades and citizens for further successful opposition to the aggressor in RBiH."

=== Recipients ===
By decree of the Presidency of the Republic of Bosnia and Herzegovina in 1994, the Order of Hero of the Liberation War was awarded to: Safet Hadžić, Mehdin Hodžić, Hajrudin Mešić, Adil Bešić, Safet Zajko, Midhad Hujdur, Enver Šehović and Nesib Malkić, while Izet Nanić was awarded the same order in 1998.

All recipients of this award were awarded posthumously. They were also awarded the Order of the Golden Lily.

== In media ==
The song "Devet heroja" ("Nine heroes") written by Dževad Ibrahimović and interpreted by Mustafa Isaković is dedicated to nine Bosnian army heroes of the Liberation War.
