= Uglješići =

- Village
- Location within Bosnia and Herzegovina
- Coordinates: 43°53′43″N 18°21′00″E
- Country: Bosnia and Herzegovina
- Entity: Federation of Bosnia and Herzegovina
- Canton: Sarajevo
- Municipality: Vogošća

Area
  - Total: 0.21 sq mi (0.55 km^{2})

Population (2013)
  - Total: 322
  - Density: 1,500/sq mi (590/km^{2})
- Time zone: UTC+1 (CET)
  - Summer (DST): UTC+2 (CEST)

Uglješići is a village in Vogošća municipality, near Sarajevo, Federation of Bosnia and Herzegovina, Bosnia and Herzegovina.

== Demographics ==
According to the 2013 census, its population was 322.

Ethnicity in 2013
Ethnicity	Number	Percentage
Bosniaks	320	99.4%
other/undeclared	2	0.6%
Total	322	100%
