= Tihovići =

- Village
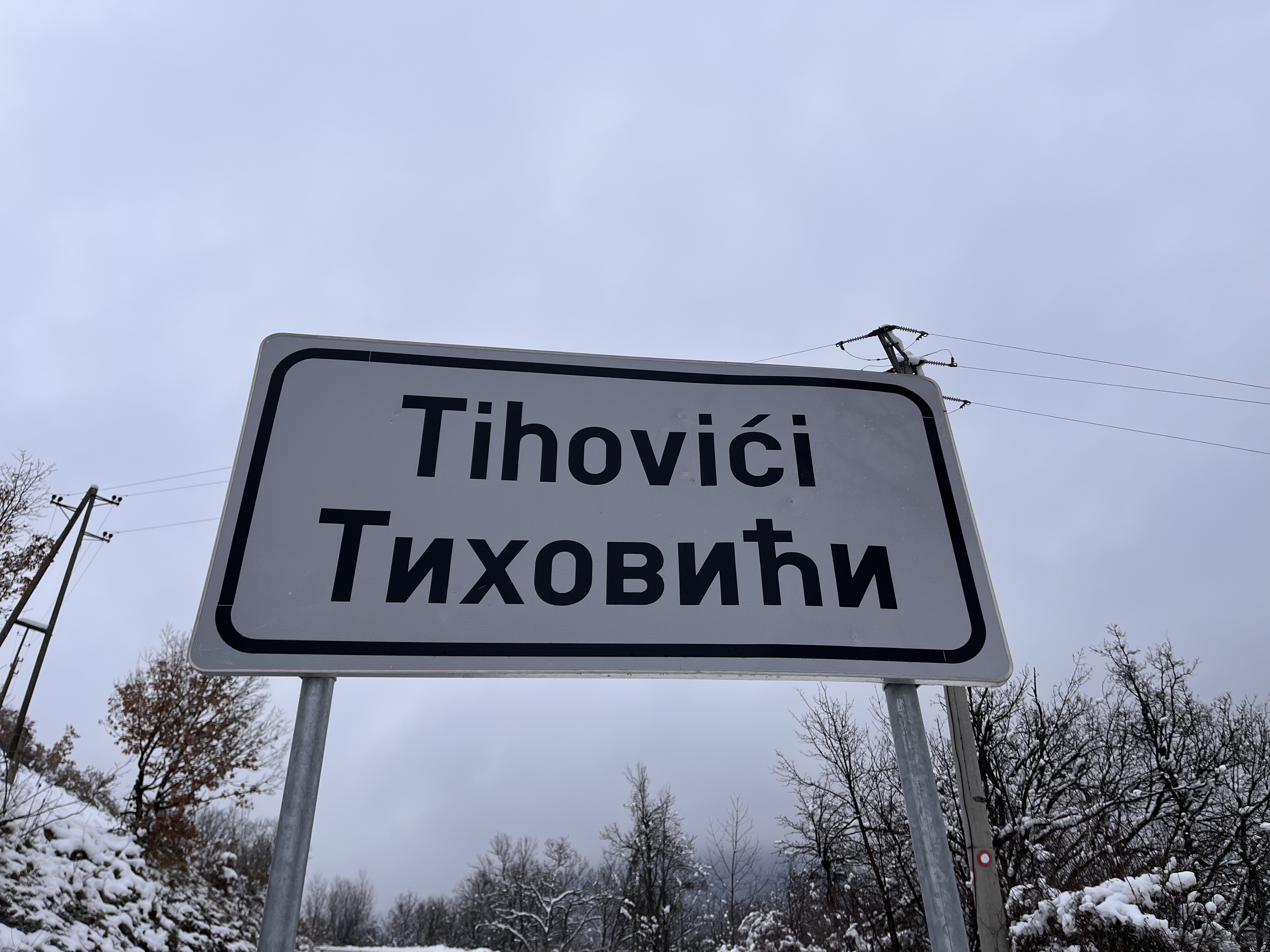

- Location within Bosnia and Herzegovina
- Coordinates: 43°55′11″N 18°22′36″E
- Country: Bosnia and Herzegovina
- Entity: Federation of Bosnia and Herzegovina
- Canton: Sarajevo
- Municipality: Vogošća

Area
  - Total: 1.24 sq mi (3.20 km^{2})

Population (2013)
  - Total: 337
  - Density: 273/sq mi (105/km^{2})
- Time zone: UTC+1 (CET)
  - Summer (DST): UTC+2 (CEST)

Tihovići is a village in Vogošća municipality, near Sarajevo, Federation of Bosnia and Herzegovina, Bosnia and Herzegovina.

== Demographics ==
According to the 2013 census, its population was 337.

Ethnicity in 2013
Ethnicity	Number	Percentage
Bosniaks	329	97.6%
other/undeclared	8	2.4%
Total	337	100%
