= Svrake =

- Village
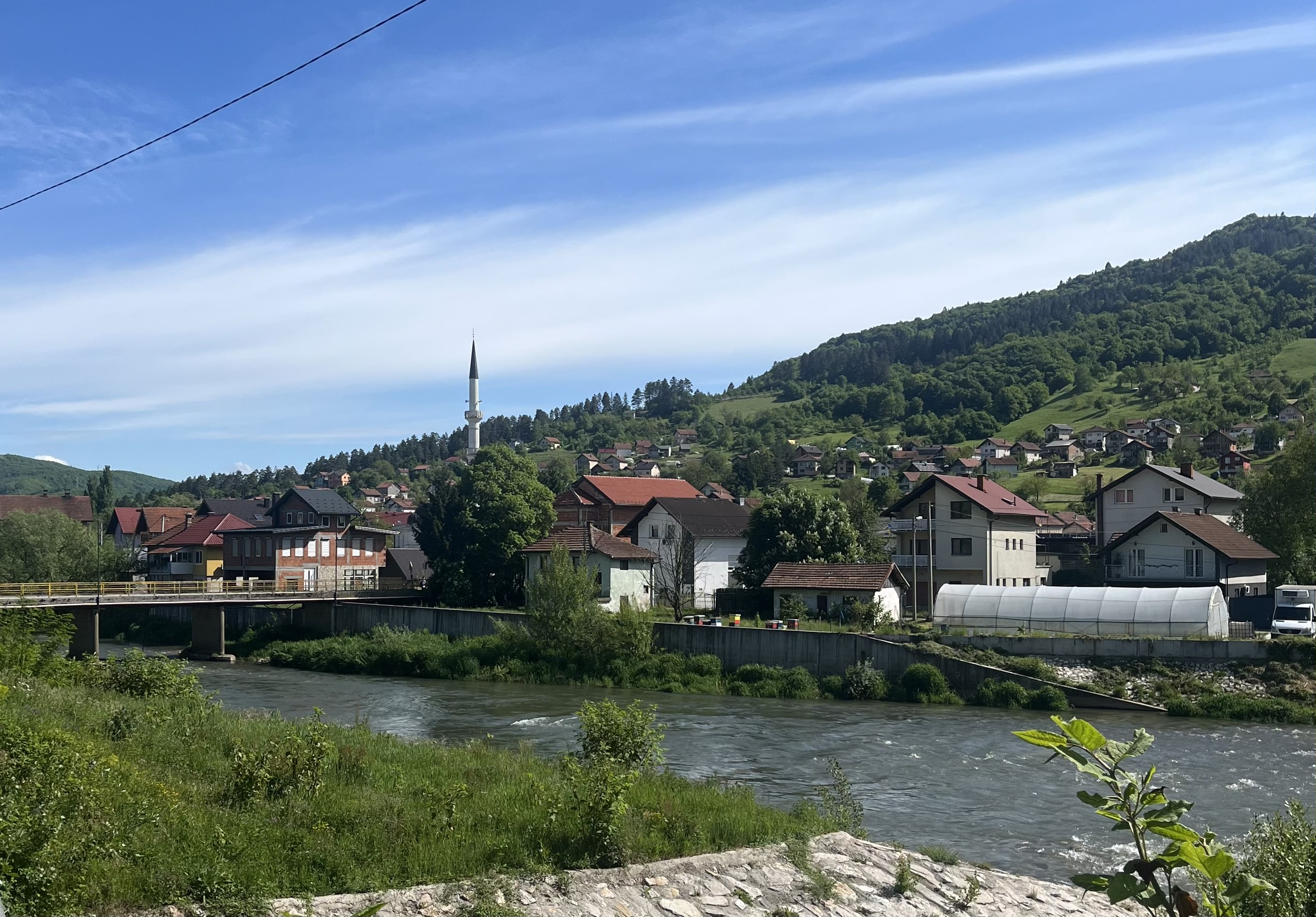

- Location within Bosnia and Herzegovina
- Coordinates: 43°55′15″N 18°18′18″E
- Country: Bosnia and Herzegovina
- Entity: Federation of Bosnia and Herzegovina
- Canton: Sarajevo
- Municipality: Vogošća

Area
  - Total: 1.41 sq mi (3.65 km^{2})

Population (2013)
  - Total: 1,204
  - Density: 854/sq mi (330/km^{2})
- Time zone: UTC+1 (CET)
  - Summer (DST): UTC+2 (CEST)

Svrake is a village in Vogošća municipality, near Sarajevo, Federation of Bosnia and Herzegovina, Bosnia and Herzegovina.

== Demographics ==
The village has 1,204 inhabitants, 96% of whom are Bosniaks. In 1991, this figure was about 83%, while between 1992 and 1996, during the Bosnian War, probably less than 1%. After reintegration of Svrake in April 2006, after Dayton Peace Agreement, Orthodox Serb population had left Svrake and almost none had returned. Svrake had suffered great atrocities and crimes during early stages of war in 1992 and thereafter, which was a stumbling stone leading to today's smaller presence of Serbian population.
