= Krivoglavci =

- Village
- Location within Bosnia and Herzegovina
- Coordinates: 43°54′09″N 18°19′21″E
- Country: Bosnia and Herzegovina
- Entity: Federation of Bosnia and Herzegovina
- Canton: Sarajevo
- Municipality: Vogošća

Area
  - Total: 1.10 sq mi (2.85 km^{2})

Population (2013)
  - Total: 613
  - Density: 557/sq mi (215/km^{2})
- Time zone: UTC+1 (CET)
  - Summer (DST): UTC+2 (CEST)

Krivoglavci is a village in Vogošća municipality, near Sarajevo, Federation of Bosnia and Herzegovina, Bosnia and Herzegovina.

== Demographics ==
According to the 2013 census, its population was 613.

Ethnicity in 2013
Ethnicity	Number	Percentage
Bosniaks	578	94.3%
Serbs	6	1.0%
Croats	3	0.5%
other/undeclared	26	4.2%
Total	613	100%
