= Kremeš =

- Village
- Location within Bosnia and Herzegovina
- Coordinates: 43°55′25″N 18°20′34″E
- Country: Bosnia and Herzegovina
- Entity: Federation of Bosnia and Herzegovina
- Canton: Sarajevo
- Municipality: Vogošća

Area
  - Total: 4.70 sq mi (12.16 km^{2})

Population (2013)
  - Total: 114
  - Density: 24.3/sq mi (9.37/km^{2})
- Time zone: UTC+1 (CET)
  - Summer (DST): UTC+2 (CEST)

Kremeš is a village in Vogošća municipality, near Sarajevo, Federation of Bosnia and Herzegovina, Bosnia and Herzegovina.

== Demographics ==
According to the 2013 census, its population was 114.

Ethnicity in 2013
Ethnicity	Number	Percentage
Bosniaks	89	78.1%
Serbs	21	18.4%
Croats	1	0.9%
other/undeclared	3	2.6%
Total	114	100%
