= Stupni Do massacre =

1993 mass killing during the Croat–Bosniak War

- Part of Croat–Bosniak War (Lašva Valley ethnic cleansing)
- Stupni Do (Bosnia and Herzegovina)
- Location: 44°07′30″N 18°19′25″E; Stupni Do, Bosnia and Herzegovina
- Date: 23 October 1993 (Central European Time)
- Target: Bosniak civilians
- Attack type: Mass Killing
- Weapons: Small arms, Arson
- Deaths: 37–44
- Perpetrator: Croatian Defence Council (HVO)
- Assailants: "Apostoli" special purposes unit; "Maturice" special purposes unit; Commanders: Ivica Rajić (on-site commander); Slobodan Praljak (issued "show no mercy" order)
- Motive: Ethnic cleansing
- Inquiry: International Criminal Tribunal for the former Yugoslavia (ICTY)
- Verdict: Guilty plea (by Ivica Rajić)
- Convictions: Grave breaches of the Geneva Conventions
- Convicted: Ivica Rajić (Commander)

The Stupni Do massacre was a massacre committed by Croatian forces on Bosniak civilians during the Croat–Bosniak war in the village of Stupni Do in Vareš municipality. It was committed on 23 October 1993 by Croatian Defence Council (HVO) units called "Apostoli" and "Maturice" led by Ivica Rajić, who pleaded guilty before ICTY for war crimes in October 2005. The Croat forces took control of the village and massacred most of the captured people. They raped the women before killing them and looted all houses before setting them on fire. The number of victims is at least 37-44.

== Background ==
In April 1993, the Lašva Valley ethnic cleansing carried out by the Croatian Community of Herzeg-Bosnia against Bosniaks was culminating. Ethnic cleansing was continued afterwards as well, but with difficulties as Bosnian Army started to retaliate against Croatian attacks. According to the conclusion in the verdict against general Tihomir Blaškić, there is no doubt whatsoever that the attacks carried out by the HVO in April and June 1993 were not justified by strictly military reasons but also targeted Muslim civilians and their possessions in order to make the Muslim civilian populations flee and to ensure that they did not return. In order to achieve this the HVO soldiers mainly acted as follows: they terrorised the civilians by intensive shelling, murders and violence; they systematically torched and destroyed their private homes and places of worship usually after looting them; they slaughtered the livestock and seized agricultural reserves; and finally, they arrested and detained in camps, then finally exchanged or expelled Muslim civilians towards territories under the control of the Army of Bosnia and Herzegovina. Ethnic cleansing was very brutal in Kiseljak municipality under the command of Ivica Rajić. The ICTY Trial Chamber notes that the Kiseljak authorities created an official commission responsible for driving civilians out of the region. Finally, it points out that the municipality in which 10,000 Muslims lived before the hostilities had only 800 remaining after.

In conclusion, and as was pointed out by Captain Lanthier, an officer with the Canadian armed forces who served with UNPROFOR from April to November 1993, who was able to visit many of the villages in the Kiseljak enclave after the hostilities:

What had happened in the Kiseljak pocket is what is known as ethnic cleansing, where deliberately the citizens had been attacked, that is, those citizens of Muslim origin and only them. The others had been left untouched. It wasn't specifically the villages that were attacked but specifically people within the villages. That was what allowed me – that is the conclusion I came to. […] In my mind, it was clear, and even more so in retrospect, that the operations that were carried out in the Vitez and Kiseljak pockets constituted ethnic cleansing of the Muslim population living there. They were carried out in the military fashion. The tactics utilised and the use of the land and all the other factors, which I have already mentioned, indicates quite clearly that [the situation was not] that one day to the next, a farmer decides to exterminate his neighbours, but rather a systematic extermination […] When you look at what happened in Vitez two days later, this thing continued in the Kiseljak pocket, and then several days later, in Breza, in this 302nd Brigade, I was told that the same thing was being prepared for Vareš and Stupni Do. And I was told by this brigade that he feared for Stupni Do. History showed later on that the exact same thing was to happen there. So it was systematic, it was organised, and there was no doubt whatsoever that this was a military operation against a civilian population.

== June 1993 ultimatum ==
In June 1993, the Vareš HVO issued an ultimatum to Bosnian Muslims in the villages of Daštansko and Stupni Do to surrender their weapons. The Daštansko villagers surrendered their weapons. In Stupni Do, before the expiration of the ultimatum, most of the villagers, fearing an attack, took refuge in neighbouring villages but returned home after several days. Knowing that the Bosnian Army would retaliate if the HVO attacked Stupni Do to disarm the village, the HVO withdrew the ultimatum and the villagers were allowed to keep their weapons.

== October 1993 attack ==
By October 1993 the Croat forces were isolated and found their freedom of movement increasingly limited. The Central Bosnian leadership of Croats was concerned about Vareš, which it feared might be handed over in the international negotiations. The HVO had taken over Vareš in June 1992 but it had always been isolated and surrounded by territories controlled by Bosnian government. On 23 August 1993 the leaders of the HVO in Vareš presented ECMM Monitors with a copy of a letter, which had been sent to Franjo Tuđman, Mate Boban and Dario Kordić, complaining about the proposed future of Vareš, as decided in the Geneva talks, when it was proposed that the municipality come under Bosnian Muslim control.

=== Units ===
On 21 October 1993, while Ivica Rajić and Milivoj Petković were in Kiseljak, the commander of the Bobovac Brigade, based in Vareš, asked for assistance in responding to Bosnian Army attack on HVO military positions in Vareš municipality. Milivoj Petković ordered Ivica Rajić to take HVO forces and seize control of the situation in Vareš town and the surrounding area. Ivica Rajić left Kiseljak town with approximately two hundred soldiers, including commanders and soldiers of the "Maturice" and "Apostoli" units and HVO soldiers from Kiseljak and Kakanj. These forces passed through the Serb-controlled territory and reached Vareš town on 22 October 1993. The Croat commanders and members who travelled from Kiseljak to Vareš included Dominik Ilijašević a.k.a. Como (later convicted of war crimes by the Court of Bosnia and Herzegovina), Miroslav Anić a.k.a. Firga, Marinko Kepić, Marinko Ljoljo, Marinko Šunjić and Marinko Jurišić a.k.a. Špiro.

The HVO units under Ivica Rajić command, including the Maturice and Ban Josip Jelačić Brigade, had participated in earlier operations against Bosnian Muslims villages in Kiseljak municipality and committed crimes against Bosnian Muslims, including murder, rape, destruction of property, arbitrary arrest and physical assault. Ivica Rajić knew, for example, that commanders and members of Maturice, including Miroslav Anić a.k.a. Firga, mutilated Bosnian Muslims and hung their heads in the "open market" in Kiseljak town. During the same time, Dominik Iljašević a.k.a. Como drove around Kiseljak with a cut off Muslim ear attached to the antenna of his car.

=== Orders ===
On 23 October 1993, the head of the HVO Main Staff, Slobodan Praljak, ordered Ivica Rajić and others to "sort out the situation in Vareš showing no mercy towards anyone. Find people who are up to both the times and the tasks." Slobodan Praljak's order was known by local HVO commanders and soldiers and further escalated the highly charged and aggressive attitude against Bosnian Muslims in the Vareš area.

Ivica Rajić ordered HVO forces including the Kakanj soldiers (who had demonstrated extreme aggression toward the Bosnian Muslim population in Vareš and showed a strong desire to destroy everything that was not Croat) to attack Stupni Do and Bogoš Hill and to arrest and detain military-aged Muslim men in Vareš town.

Stupni Do is a village located in the hills about one kilometre south of the town of Vareš, at a height of 1074 metres, with one principal road leading to it through a tunnel. The village lies above the main supply route to Vareš (which itself lies at the head of a valley with mountains all round it). Above the village is the Croat village of Mir. Before the war the inhabitants of Stupni Do were almost all Bosnian Muslim (although there had been five or six Serb families who had left in 1992). The total population was about 224. The significance of the village in October 1993 also lay in the fact that it was in the Vareš pocket (controlled by the HVO) close both to the Bosnian Army front lines and also the Serb front lines: thus, according to one ECMM witness, a point between the warring parties ideal for smuggling and the exchange of goods and arms. Bosniaks had no chance to resist Croatian attack due to the fact local Bosnian Territorial Defense unit was poorly equipped, armed with 40 rifles (majority for hunting) with no military training: most wore civilian clothing. Additionally, on October 17, six members of this unit were arrested and detained. According to Colonel Stutt, a Canadian officer and member of the ECMM, Stupni Do was a loosely organised village; with no sign of a military buildup, fortification or any sign of artillery. It was loosely protected by six Bosnian soldiers. On the other hand, both "Maturice" and "Apostoli" units were special purposes units supported by heavy artillery.

== War crimes ==
In Stupni Do, HVO commanders and soldiers forced Bosnian Muslim civilians out of their homes and hiding places, robbed them of their valuables, wilfully killed men, women and children and sexually assaulted women. Twelve villagers were forced into a shed which HVO soldiers then set on fire. The HVO attack on Stupni Do resulted in the deaths of at least thirty-seven Bosnian Muslim men, women, elderly and children (approximately six of whom were combatants). On 23–24 October 1993, most of the village was either wholly or partially destroyed.

In terms of the Bosnian Muslims who died in the attack, at least the following were murdered: Three men and one woman were executed by being shot or having their throats cut; One woman was taken into a house by an HVO soldier where she was executed; Two elderly women, one of whom was an invalid, were found burned inside a house; One man was shot several times at close range after he refused to give an HVO soldier his money; When a group of Bosnian Muslims (one man, nine women and three children) attempted to flee, the man was shot and killed (his half-burned body was later found at the same location where he was shot), and two of the women and all three children were murdered in front of their house; Three of the young women who escaped the initial encounter with the HVO soldiers were then found hiding in a small cellar and murdered; Seven members of the same family (two men, three women and two children aged 2 and 3 years old) were found burned inside their shelter; One man, who had been severely wounded in both legs, was carried into a house which was later set on fire by HVO soldiers; (The man's burned body, together with another burned body, was later found inside the house.) One woman was taken into a room and shot, and the house then set on fire.

Two international witnesses gave evidence of what they found in the village in the aftermath of the attack. The first, Rolf Weckesser, was an ECMM monitor who tried to get to the village on the morning after the attack but found the HVO blocking the road and refusing entry: the soldiers appeared to be drunk and were yelling and said: "We did not like this job, but we had to do it, and we do not like our leaders." On 27 October 1993 the witness finally succeeded in getting access to Stupni Do with the assistance of the local battalion of UNPROFOR (Nordbat). He found a scene of complete destruction with the houses still smouldering and about 20 bodies burnt beyond recognition, some of them the bodies of children. There were no indications of fighting.

In Vareš town, HVO including members of the Apostoli and military police units, rounded up more than 250 Bosnian Muslim men and detained them in the "Ivan Goran Kovačić" and "Vladimir Nazor" schools. During the process of rounding up the above-mentioned men, the HVO commanders and soldiers entered houses and physically and mentally abused the inhabitants and persons present and robbed them of their valuables. Detained Bosnian Muslim men were beaten and abused by HVO soldiers. During the time from approximately 23 October to 3 November 1993, in Vareš town, HVO commanders and soldiers under Ivica Rajić's command and control looted and appropriated Muslim property, robbed Muslims of their valuables and sexually assaulted Muslim women.

== Cover-up operation ==
On 23 October 1993, Ivica Rajić reported to Dario Kordić, Milivoj Petković, Tihomir Blaškić and Mario Bradara (commander of the Ban Josip Jelačić Brigade): "I made an assessment and in the morning hours I carried out an attack on Stupni Do and Bogoš [...] The town of Vareš has been mopped up and all Muslims of military age placed under surveillance. [...] As of today, Vareš is Croatian and we shall fight to keep it that way - you must help me."

Between the evening of 23 October 1993 and 26 October 1993, Ivica Rajić refused several requests by the United Nations Protection Force (UNPROFOR) to enter Stupni Do and the two local schools in Vareš town in order to investigate what had happened at these locations. On the instructions of his HVO superiors, including Milivoj Petković, Ivica Rajić participated in a cover-up concerning the crimes committed in and around Vareš town and Stupni Do. The cover-up included a false investigation which was intended to conceal the true nature and extent of the crimes committed. Ivica Rajić signed investigation reports prepared by SIS knowing that they included false information. As part of this cover-up, Milivoj Petković ordered Ivica Rajić to change his name to Viktor Andrić. In fact, the HVO never conducted a bona fide investigation of what happened in Vareš town or at Stupni Do, and no HVO commander or soldier, including Ivica Rajić, was ever punished, disciplined or removed for what happened at these locations.

== Aftermath ==
Ivica Rajić left Vareš town on 26 October 1993, leaving Boro Malbašić and Krešimir Božić in command. On 1 November 1993, the HVO promoted Ivica Rajić to the rank of active colonel. On 27 December 1993, Ivica Rajić informed HVO authorities, including Milivoj Petković, that, as ordered, he was changing his name to Viktor Andrić. On 30 December 1993, in an action meant to indicate to the international community that Ivica Rajić had been punished and removed from command because of what had happened in Vareš and Stupni Do, the HVO removed "Ivica Rajić" from command and Viktor Andrić was appointed to replace him. Rajić left Bosnia after the pressure on Croatian authorities to arrest indicted war criminals. With the help of some Croatian institutions he was hiding in Croatia until 5 April 2003, when he was finally arrested. On 27 June 2003 and 29 January 2004 he pleaded not guilty to all charges. However, on 26 October 2005, he pleaded guilty to grave breaches of the Geneva Conventions. On 8 May 2006, he was sentenced to 12 years' imprisonment, and on 13 April 2007 transferred to Spain to serve the remainder of his sentence.

On 1 November 2010, Miroslav Anić, a former member of the 'Maturice' Special Purposes Squad with the Croatian Defence Council that's suspected of having committed war crimes in Vareš, Kiseljak, and specifically the Stupni Do massacre, surrendered to authorities in Bosnia and Herzegovina.

== Sources ==
- "Prosecutor v. Ivica Rajić a.k.a. Viktor Andrić, Case no. IT-95-12-S, Sentencing Judgement" (PDF). ICTY.org. International Criminal Tribunal for the former Yugoslavia. 8 May 2006.
- "Prosecutor v. Tihomir Blaškić, Case no. IT-95-14-T, Judgement" (PDF). ICTY.org. International Criminal Tribunal for the former Yugoslavia. 3 March 2000.
- "Prosecutor v. Dario Kordić & Mario Čerkez, Case no. IT-95-14/2-T, Judgement" (PDF). ICTY.org. International Criminal Tribunal for the former Yugoslavia. 26 February 2001.
