= Grahovište =

- Village
- Location within Bosnia and Herzegovina
- Coordinates: 43°52′48″N 18°22′38″E
- Country: Bosnia and Herzegovina
- Entity: Federation of Bosnia and Herzegovina
- Canton: Sarajevo
- Municipality: Vogošća

Area
  - Total: 0.55 sq mi (1.43 km^{2})

Population (2013)
  - Total: 93
  - Density: 170/sq mi (65/km^{2})
- Time zone: UTC+1 (CET)
  - Summer (DST): UTC+2 (CEST)

Grahovište is a village in Vogošća municipality, near Sarajevo, Federation of Bosnia and Herzegovina, Bosnia and Herzegovina.

== Demographics ==
According to the 2013 census, its population was 93.

Ethnicity in 2013
Ethnicity	Number	Percentage
Bosniaks	74	79.6%
Serbs	3	3.2%
Croats	1	1.1%
other/undeclared	15	16.1%
Total	93	100%
