= Kemal Ademović =

Bosnian politician (born 1961)

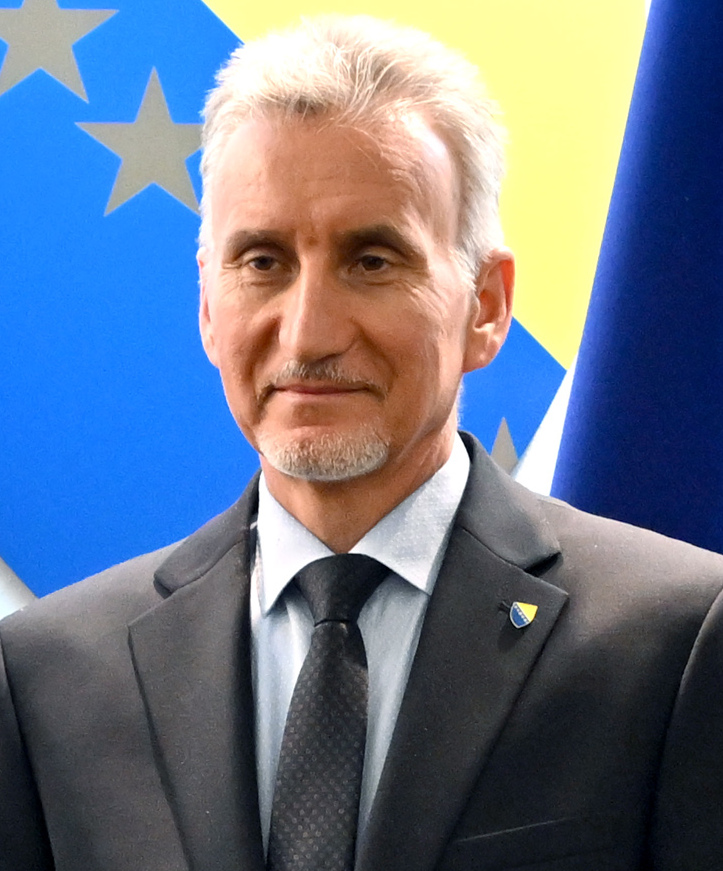
- Ademović in 2025

Member of the House of Peoples
- Incumbent
- Assumed office 16 February 2023

Director of the Investigation and Documentation Agency
- In office 1996–2001

Personal details
- Born: 10 August 1961 (age 65) Srebrenica, PR Bosnia and Herzegovina, FPR Yugoslavia
- Party: Independent (since 2026)
- Other political affiliations: People and Justice (2018–2026); Party of Democratic Action (until 2018)
- Children: 2
- Education: University of Sarajevo (LLB)
- Awards: Order of the Golden Lily

Kemal Ademović (born 10 August 1961) is a Bosnian politician and former intelligence officer serving as member of the national House of Peoples since February 2023. A former member of the Party of Democratic Action, he left the party in 2018 to join People and Justice, which he then also left in 2026.

Born in Srebrenica in 1961, Ademović graduated from the University of Sarajevo. He worked in the Bosnian Special Police Units. Prior to his political career, Ademović served as director of the state intelligence Investigation and Documentation Agency, following the Bosnian War, from 1996 to 2001. He was elected to the Sarajevo Canton Assembly in 2010, and was re-elected in 2014. Following the 2022 general election, Ademović was appointed member of the national House of Peoples.

== Early life and education ==
Ademović was born in Srebrenica, PR Bosnia and Herzegovina, FPR Yugoslavia, on 10 August 1961, and he is a Bosniak. He became a police officer in 1980, and joined the Bosnian Special Police Units in 1982. He graduated from the Faculty of Law in Sarajevo in 1992.

== Career ==
Ademović served in the Army of the Republic of Bosnia and Herzegovina during the Bosnian War and was awarded the Order of the Golden Lily, which was at the time the highest state order awarded for military merits. He was appointed director of the Investigation and Documentation Agency of Bosnia and Herzegovina in 1996, a precursor to the modern-day Intelligence-Security Agency, and served until 2001.

Ademović joined the Party of Democratic Action (SDA), and was elected to the Sarajevo Canton Assembly in the 2010 general election. He was re-elected in the 2014 general election. During his tenure, he served as deputy chair of the assembly. Ademović left the SDA in dissent to join People and Justice (NiP) in 2018. Ademović was a founding member of NiP and was elected as its deputy president in 2021. Following the 2022 general election, he was appointed member of the national House of Peoples in February 2023.

During his tenure in the House of Peoples, Ademović has served on the Constitutional and Legal committee. On 16 February 2023, he became vice-chairman of the house under chairman Nikola Špirić. The position of chair rotates around the three members of the Collegium, whose current members are Ademović, Špirić and Dragan Čović. Ademović served as chairman from October 2023 to June 2024, and will serve again from October 2025 to June 2026.

In March 2026, Ademović left NiP following disagreements with party leader Elmedin Konaković.

== Controversies ==
In June 2024, the Prosecutor's Office of Bosnia and Herzegovina launched an investigation into Ademović, former Intelligence-Security Agency director Osman Mehmedagić, and former Presidency member Bakir Izetbegović after former intelligence agent Edin Garaplija accused them of being involved in a criminal organisation in 1996, which conducted politically-motivated murders. Garaplija was a witness for the trials of war criminals Radovan Karadžić and Ratko Mladić.

== Personal life ==
Ademović's son, Jasmin, was also a member of People and Justice and served as speaker of the Sarajevo City Council from 2021 to 2025.
