= Daštansko =

Village in Vareš, Bosnia and Herzegovina

- Village
- Location within Bosnia and Herzegovina
- Coordinates: 44.1452892°N 18.3634634°E
- Country: Bosnia and Herzegovina
- Entity: Federation of Bosnia and Herzegovina
- Canton: Zenica-Doboj
- Municipality: Vareš

Area
  - Total: 1.30 sq mi (3.37 km^{2})

Population (2013)
  - Total: 118
  - Density: 90.7/sq mi (35.0/km^{2})
- Time zone: UTC+1 (CET)
  - Summer (DST): UTC+2 (CEST)

Daštansko is a village in the municipality of Vareš, Bosnia and Herzegovina.

== Demographics ==
According to the 2013 census, its population was 118.

Ethnicity in 2013
Ethnicity	Number	Percentage
Bosniaks	103	87.3%
Croats	15	12.7%
Total	118	100%
