= Nordbat =

Nordbat, short for Nordic Battalion may refer to:

- Nordbat 1, Nordic Battalion in Republic of Macedonia from January 1993 until 1994.
- Nordbat 2, Nordic Battalion part of UNPROFOR in Bosnia from October 1993 until April 1994.
