= Dubrave Gornje =

- Village
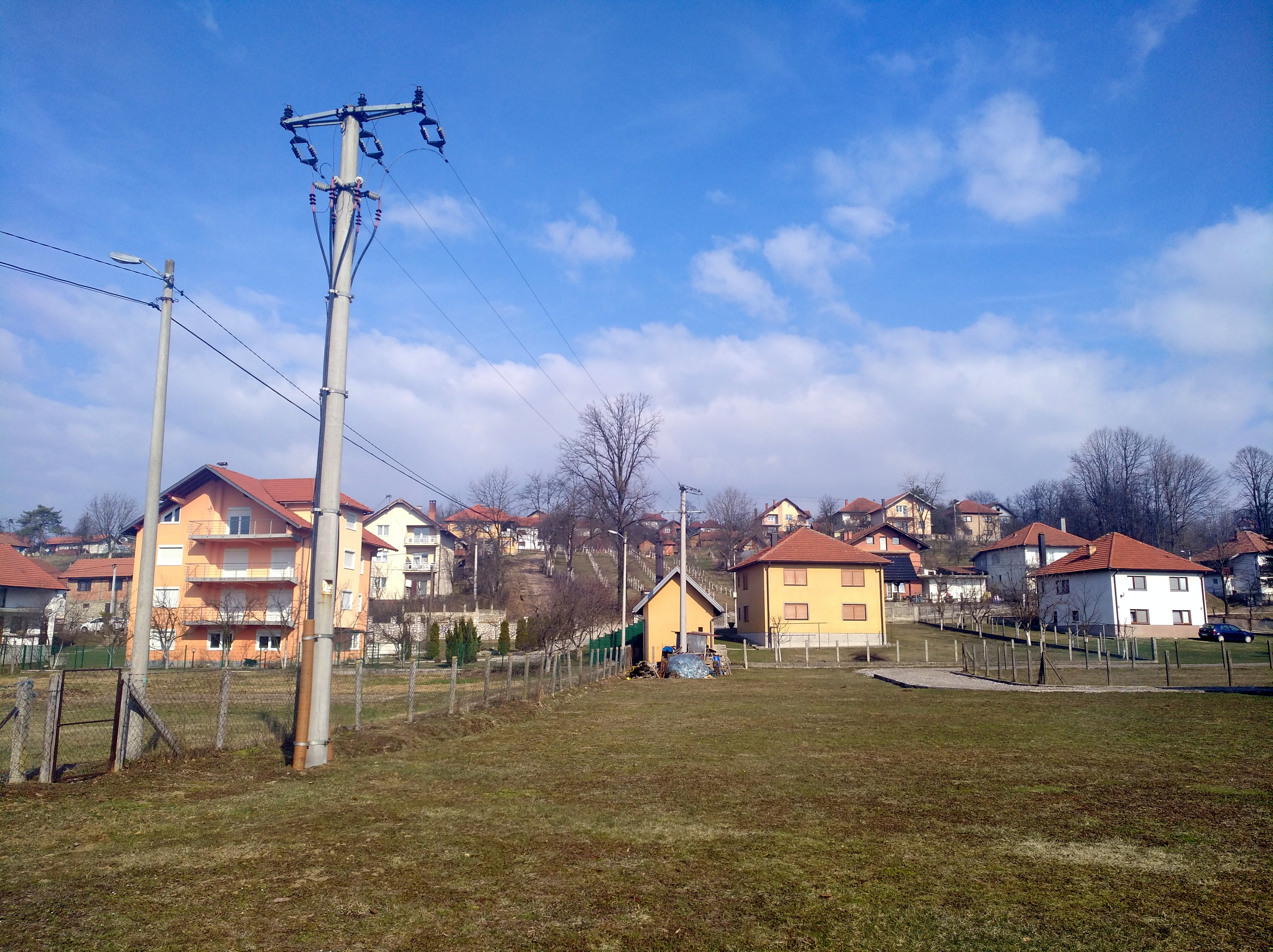

- Location within Bosnia and Herzegovina
- Coordinates: 44.4692°N 18.6798°E
- Country: Bosnia and Herzegovina
- Entity: Federation of Bosnia and Herzegovina
- Canton: Tuzla
- Municipality: Živinice

Area
  - Total: 10.09 sq mi (26.14 km^{2})

Population (2013)
  - Total: 3,308
  - Density: 327.8/sq mi (126.5/km^{2})
- Time zone: UTC+1 (CET)
  - Summer (DST): UTC+2 (CEST)

Dubrave Gornje is a village in the municipality of Živinice, Bosnia and Herzegovina. It is the location of Tuzla International Airport.

== Demographics ==
According to the 2013 census, its population was 3,308.

Ethnicity in 2013
Ethnicity	Number	Percentage
Bosniaks	3,229	97.6%
Croats	1	0.0%
Serbs	1	0.0%
other/undeclared	77	2.3%
Total	3,308	100%
