= Ugorsko =

- Village
- Location within Bosnia and Herzegovina
- Coordinates: 43°53′N 18°21′E
- Country: Bosnia and Herzegovina
- Entity: Federation of Bosnia and Herzegovina
- Canton: Sarajevo
- Municipality: Vogošća

Area
  - Total: 0.76 sq mi (1.96 km^{2})

Population (2013)
  - Total: 1,017
  - Density: 1,340/sq mi (519/km^{2})
- Time zone: UTC+1 (CET)
  - Summer (DST): UTC+2 (CEST)

Ugorsko is a village in Vogošća municipality, near Sarajevo, Federation of Bosnia and Herzegovina, Bosnia and Herzegovina.

== Demographics ==
According to the 2013 census, its population was 1,017.

Ethnicity in 2013
Ethnicity	Number	Percentage
Bosniaks	990	97.3%
Croats	6	0.6%
other/undeclared	21	2.1%
Total	1,017	100%
