= Black Swans (special forces) =

Black Swans Crni labudovi
- The official patch of the unit.
- Active: 1992–1998
- Allegiance: Republic of Bosnia and Herzegovina
- Type: Special Forces
- Part of: Patriotic League (Bosnia and Herzegovina)
- Garrison/HQ: Konjic, Bosnia and Herzegovina
- Colors
- March: Selam ti je hadžija
- Engagements: Bosnian War: Siege of Sarajevo; Operation Brana 94; Operation Autumn '94; Battle for Vozuća; Operation Sana

Commanders
- Notable commanders: Mehdin Hodžić; Hase Tirić; Hajrudin Mešić

The Black Swans (Bosnian: Crni labudovi) was a special forces unit within the Army of the Republic of Bosnia and Herzegovina. It was a Patriotic League unit formed in 1992 in Sapna, under the 2nd Corps (later 1st Corps) which eventually numbered 800 men. It earned a reputation for battlefield bravery. The first commander, Mehdin Hodžić, was a former member of the Special anti-terrorist unit of the Yugoslav Ministry of Internal Affairs (MUP). When he took command of the Black Swans, he would be known as "Kapetan Senad" or Captain Senad. Captain Hajrudin Mešić then went on to take command of the unit for a while. The most successful and lasting commander was Brigadier Hase Tirić. The Black Swans' areas of operation included Konjic, Igman and Jablanica.

The Black Swans wore black and/or woodland camouflage uniforms (of Bosnian, US or commercial origin) and with their unit patch worn on a black brassard on the right sleeve with the ARBIH patch sometimes worn on the left sleeve. However, some members wore the Black Swans patch on their left sleeve (on a black brassard), pinned to one of the chest pockets or even pinned on their vests instead. Also, civilian clothing items (t-shirts, sneakers, caps) seem to have been common as well. A wide array of berets, scarves, headbands, bandanas, black watch caps, camouflage caps and civilian caps (trucker caps in black or black and white seem to have been common) were worn as well. Green headbands with the Shahada written in Arabic can also be seen. US surplus M1 helmets complete with ERDL pattern or M81 U.S. Woodland helmet covers were also common. Many fighters of the unit also fought with bare heads. The vests used were mostly of Bosnian army origin in OD or woodland, as well as some M1956 flak vests as well as the odd Croatian mesh vest (rare, but sometimes seen). Various types of civilian or military black flak vests and tactical vests were also used. Other equipment were usually of ex-JNA, NATO or commercial origin.

In contrast with the uniformed and tactical look of the post-war Black Swans association, the war-time Black Swans were a rag-tag looking force – sourcing uniforms and equipment wherever they could find it, much like the rest of the Bosnian armed forces.

A selection of the armament used by the unit: Zastava M70, Zastava M84, Heckler & Koch MP5, Heckler & Koch G3, FN FAL, AKM, FAMAS, and Milkor MGL.
