= Ivica Rajić =

Bosnian Croat soldier

Ivica Rajić (born 5 May 1958 in Jehovac, SR Bosnia and Herzegovina, Yugoslavia) was a commander in the Croatian Defence Council (HVO) during the 1992–1995 war in Bosnia and Herzegovina. He was later convicted of war crimes.

Rajić was an officer in the Yugoslav People's Army (JNA) prior to 1992 which is when he joined the HVO. Rajić operated out of the central Bosnian town of Kiseljak as the Commander of the Second Operational Group of the HVO's Central Bosnia Operative Zone. Rajić was responsible for the 23–24 October 1993 massacre in the village of Stupni Do where at least 37 Bosniak people, including elderly, women and children, some of them burned alive, were killed, and several women raped by Croat forces. He was also commanded the previous day looting of the town of Vareš, where more than 250 military-aged men rounded up in their homes and then abused in the schools where they were detained.

After the massacre Rajić assumed the name Viktor Andrić and continued to serve in the HVO. He was indicted for war crimes by the International Criminal Tribunal for the former Yugoslavia on 29 August 1995, and went into hiding in the seaside city of Split in Croatia, which is where he was arrested on 5 April 2003 by Croatian authorities. Rajić was transferred to ICTY In June 2003. Rajić pleaded not guilty and was set to go on trial in 2005, which is when he then changed his plea to guilty.

The Trial Chamber found that the sentence should reflect the fact that Rajić's crimes were committed on a large scale and were of particularly violent nature, the impact of his crimes on particularly vulnerable victims, his participation in a cover-up and the fact that he absconded and obstructed justice for almost eight years. Rajić "significantly cooperated with the Prosecution providing and authenticating various important documents and confirming numerous important facts", and this was considered a mitigating factor, as was his guilty plea, which the Trial Chamber stated "helped to establish the truth surrounding the crimes committed in Stupni Do and Vareš", which "may contribute to the reconciliation of the peoples of the former Yugoslavia and to the restoration of a lasting peace in the region".

The Trial Chamber also felt that "Rajić's expression of remorse was real and sincere and must be taken into account in mitigation". On 8 May 2006, Rajić was sentenced to 12 years imprisonment for "wilful killing, inhumane treatment (including sexual assault), appropriation of property" and "extensive destruction not justified by military necessity and carried out unlawfully and wantonly", and sent to serve his sentence in Spain in 2007.

On 8 September 2011, it was announced that Rajić was granted an early release, having served eight years of his 12-year sentence.

== See also ==
- Joint criminal enterprise
