= Kobilja Glava =

- Village
- Location within Bosnia and Herzegovina
- Coordinates: 43°53′N 18°23′E
- Country: Bosnia and Herzegovina
- Entity: Federation of Bosnia and Herzegovina
- Canton: Sarajevo
- Municipality: Vogošća

Area
  - Total: 0.71 sq mi (1.84 km^{2})

Population (2013)
  - Total: 3,092
  - Density: 4,350/sq mi (1,680/km^{2})
- Time zone: UTC+1 (CET)
  - Summer (DST): UTC+2 (CEST)

Kobilja Glava is a village in Vogošća municipality, near Sarajevo, Federation of Bosnia and Herzegovina, Bosnia and Herzegovina.

== Demographics ==
According to the 2013 census, its population was 3,092.

Ethnicity in 2013
Ethnicity	Number	Percentage
Bosniaks	2,973	96.2%
Croats	6	0.2%
Serbs	3	0.1%
other/undeclared	110	3.6%
Total	3,092	100%
