= Stupni Do =

- Village
- Location within Bosnia and Herzegovina
- Coordinates: 44°07′30″N 18°19′25″E
- Country: Bosnia and Herzegovina
- Entity: Federation of Bosnia and Herzegovina
- Canton: Zenica-Doboj
- Municipality: Vareš

Area
  - Total: 1.22 sq mi (3.17 km^{2})

Population (2013)
  - Total: 135
  - Density: 110/sq mi (42.6/km^{2})
- Time zone: UTC+1 (CET)
  - Summer (DST): UTC+2 (CEST)

Stupni Do is a village in the municipality of Vareš in central Bosnia and Herzegovina. It is located 3 km southeast of the city of Vareš.

== History ==
This small village received notoriety because of the Bosnian War Stupni Do massacre (1993), in which Croat forces killed 38 Bosniaks.

== Demographics ==
According to the 2013 census, its population was 135, all Bosniaks.
