= Orders, decorations, and medals of Bosnia and Herzegovina =

Orders, decorations, and medals of Bosnia and Herzegovina are social and public recognitions, which are awarded for special contributions to the realization of human rights and freedom, for construction of democratic relations, peace and stabilization, development of International cooperation of Bosnia and Herzegovina with other countries and with International organizations and for cultural, economic and every other progress of people and citizens of Bosnia and Herzegovina. The system of honours of Bosnia and Herzegovina was established after the Croat–Bosniak War ended in 1994, and changed in May 2003.

All citizens of Bosnia and Herzegovina, economic societies, state institutions and other legal entities and non-government organizations are suitable to receive decorations of Bosnia and Herzegovina. Also, foreign citizens, foreign and International organizations and institutions are suitable. It is possible to receive a decoration post mortem.

The only authorized institution for bestowal of orders, decorations and medals of Bosnia and Herzegovina is the Presidency of Bosnia and Herzegovina.

== Current decorations ==
- Order of Freedom
- Order of Peace
- Order of Bosnia and Herzegovina
- Order of the Gold Coat of Arms of Bosnia and Herzegovina with Swords
- Order of the Gold Coat of Arms of Bosnia and Herzegovina with Sash
- Order of Bosnia and Herzegovina with Golden Wreath
- Order of Bosnia and Herzegovina with Silver Wreath
- Order of the Silver Coat of Arms of Bosnia and Herzegovina with Swords

== Former decorations (1994–2003) ==
=== Orders ===
- Order of the Hero of the Liberation War
- Order of the Golden Lily 1st Class
- Order of the Golden Lily 2nd Class
- Order of the Golden Lily 3rd Class
- Order of Freedom
- Order of Peace
- Order of the Republic
- Order of the Liberation
- Order of the Gold Coat of Arms with Swords
- Order of Military Merit 1st class
- Order of Military Merit 2nd class
- Order of Kulin Ban
- Order of the Dragon of Bosnia
- Order of the Bosnian Coat of Arms

=== Medals ===
- Medal of the Republic
- Medal of Victory
- Bravery Medal
- Medal of Labour and Enterprise
- Medal of Military Merit
- Exemplary Fighter Medal
- Medal of Merit
