= Order of Freedom (Bosnia and Herzegovina) =

Decoration of Bosnia and Herzegovina

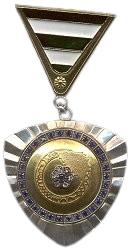
- Type: State Order
- Country: Bosnia and Herzegovina
- Presented by: the Presidency of Bosnia and Herzegovina
- Established: 1994
- Ribbon bar of the order

Precedence
- Equivalent: None
- Next (lower): Order of Peace

Order of Freedom (Bosnian: Orden slobode / Орден слободе) is the highest decoration of Bosnia and Herzegovina. It is awarded for special merits in realization of freedom and human rights, for development of understanding and trust between citizens and people of Bosnia and Herzegovina, and for merits in construction of democratic relations. Order was established in 1994.

== Sources ==
- (in Bosnian and Croatian) Zakon o odlikovanjima Bosne i Hercegovine (English: Law on decorations of Bosnia and Herzegovina) made on May 21, 2003.
