= Dragan Vikić =

Bosnian military officer

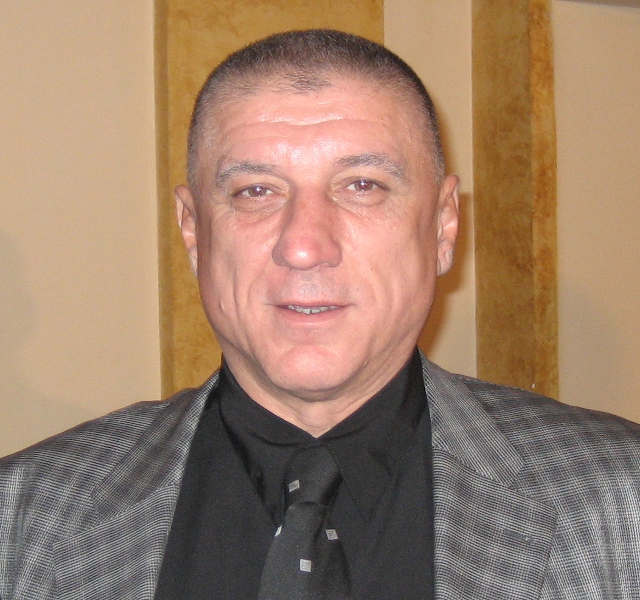
- Vikić in 2006
- Born: 8 October 1955 (age 71); Sarajevo, PR Bosnia and Herzegovina, FPR Yugoslavia
- Military career
- Allegiance: Republic of Bosnia and Herzegovina
- Branch: Police
- Commands: Bosna Special Police Squad
- Conflicts: Bosnian War; Sarajevo barricades; Siege of Sarajevo; 1992 JNA column ambush
- Awards: Order of the Golden Lily

Dragan Vikić (Cyrillic: Драган Викић; 8 October 1955) is a Bosnian former military officer with the Army of the Republic of Bosnia and Herzegovina during the Bosnian War.

== Biography ==
=== Youth and sports career ===
He was born in a mixed marriage, from a Croat father and a Serb mother. After finishing high school, he graduated from the Faculty of Physical Education of the University of Sarajevo in 1980.

As a member of the Bosna karate club, he was a three-time senior champion of Yugoslavia in the heavy-weight category and won medals at the European team championships from 1977 to 1983 as a member of the national team.

=== Bosnian War ===
At the beginning of the war on 6 April 1992, the President of the Presidency of the Socialist Republic of Bosnia and Herzegovina Alija Izetbegović entrusted him with the command of the joint forces Territorial Defense and the police. Vikić issued a proclamation: "the defenders of Sarajevo will not open fire on members of the Yugoslav People's Army and will not pose any danger to the citizens." In the Assembly of the SR of Bosnia and Herzegovina in front of television cameras, he called on the citizens of Sarajevo to defend the city from the Serbian army. At the head of Bosnia's special unit, he played a crucial role in organizing the fight in Sarajevo against the Army of Republika Srpska.

The special purpose police unit Bosnia was a special unit of the Ministry of Internal Affairs of the Republic of Bosnia and Herzegovina. It was founded on 5 April 1992 and had more than 1500 members.

Since January 1994, he was the head of the Department for Research and Application of Methods and Means for Combating Terrorism of the Ministry of Internal Affairs of the Republic of Bosnia and Herzegovina.

=== Post-war period ===
He continued his sports career and became the president of the Karate Association of Bosnia and Herzegovina.

The Croatian association from Bosnia and Herzegovina Croatia Libertas filed a lawsuit in March 2009 against 375 religious and military figures from Bosnia and Herzegovina for their participation in the establishment of concentration camps for non-Muslims in the period from 1991 to 1995; Vikić's name was on that list.

At the end of May 2012, Vikić joined the Union for a Better Future of BiH.

In December 2016, the Prosecutor's Office of Bosnia and Herzegovina initiated proceedings against Vikić on suspicion that 8 JNA members were captured and killed under his command in April 1992. In March 2017, he was summoned before the Court of Bosnia and Herzegovina to answer for the accusation of murder of 8 Yugoslav soldiers killed in April 1992 near Veliki Park in Sarajevo. He denied the accusations, saying: "My hands and the hands of my men under my command are clean." In September 2019, Bakir Izetbegović, the president of the House of Peoples of the Federation of Bosnia and Herzegovina, qualified the court proceedings as a "judicial crucifixion". In December 2022, the Court of Bosnia and Herzegovina upheld Vikić's acquittal on all charges, rejecting the prosecution's appeal as unfounded.

== Acknowledgments and awards ==
As the commander of the Special Unit of the Republic of Bosnia and Herzegovina, he was awarded several times. The most prominent decorations are the Safety Plaque and the Order of Labor with a Silver Wreath.

With his unit, he received the highest honors for bravery and service: the Golden Police Badge, the Special Badge and the Order of the Golden Lily.

The song Ponesi zastavu, Dragane Vikiću (Carry the Flag, Dragan Vikić) by Mladen Vojičić Tifa is dedicated to him.

He was awarded the Sixth of April Sarajevo Award in 2004.

== Personal life ==
He is married and has one child.
