= Vogošća =

Vogošća Вогошћа
- Town and municipality
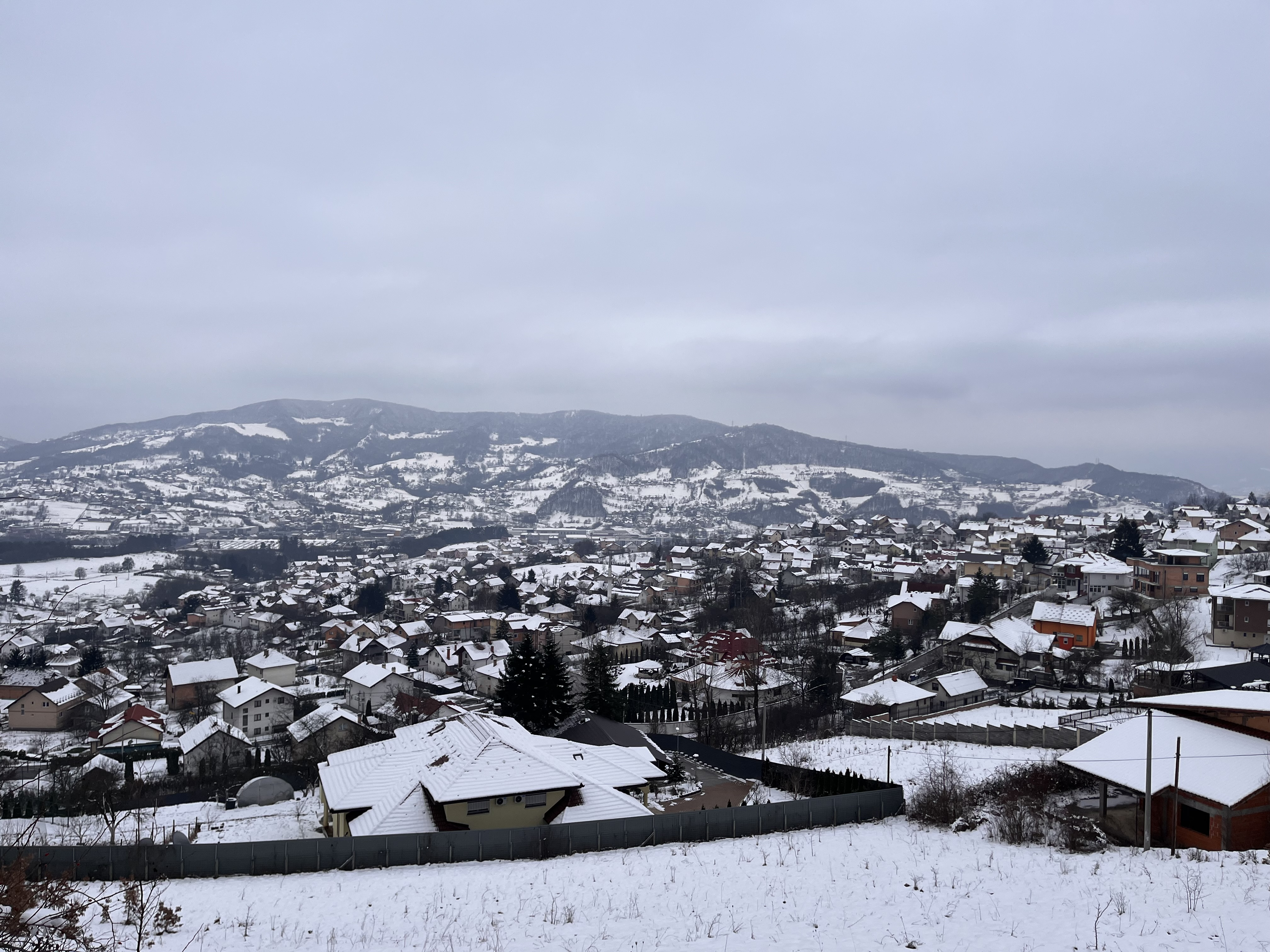

- Coat of arms

- Location within Bosnia and Herzegovina
- Coordinates: 43°54′N 18°21′E
- Country: Bosnia and Herzegovina
- Entity: Federation of Bosnia and Herzegovina
- Canton: Sarajevo Canton

Government
  - Municipal mayor: Migdad Hasanović (SDA)

Area
  - Municipality: 71.69 km^{2} (27.68 sq mi)

Population (2013)
  - Municipality: 26,343
  - Density: 367.5/km^{2} (951.7/sq mi)
  - Urban: 10,568
- Time zone: UTC+1 (CET)
  - Summer (DST): UTC+2 (CEST)
- Area code: +387 33
- Website: vogosca.ba

Vogošća (Serbian Cyrillic: Bогошћа) is a town and a municipality in Sarajevo Canton of the Federation of Bosnia and Herzegovina, an entity of Bosnia and Herzegovina. The municipality is located about 6 kilometers north of the city of Sarajevo and is its secondary suburb, after Ilidža. According to the 2013 census, the town has a population of 10,568 inhabitants, with 26,343 inhabitants in the municipality.

== History ==
=== Middle Ages ===
In the Middle Ages, Vogošća and its surroundings belonged to the parish of Vidogošća, and in that period the Avars and South Slavs began to penetrate this area. The characteristic of this time is the appearance of numerous cemeteries with stećci, and they were widespread in the areas of Gora, Krč, Crni Vrh, Krivoglavci, Vogošća and Svrak. That indicated a good population density of the Vogošće area in the late Middle Ages.

=== Ottoman Period ===
In 1435, Vogošća was mentioned in a Turkish census as "Gogošta", and in 1485 it also appeared under the name "Vogošta". With the arrival of the Ottomans, a new territorial organization was carried out, and then Ugorsko, Uglješići, Gornja Vogošta, Tihovići and Vrapče were mentioned for the first time. During that period, part of Vogošća belonged to the Bosnian Sandžak. Then, the first large movements of the population inland occurred, which caused the population of Vogošća to grow.

=== Austro-Hungarian Period ===
With the annexation and occupation of Bosnia and Herzegovina, Austria-Hungary had a significant impact on the area of Vogošća, especially on the demographic characteristics, when primarily families of workers and officials from Austria, Germany and the Czech Republic began to immigrate to Semizovac, and the characteristic was that they came for temporary work.

=== Kingdom of Yugoslavia ===
In the period of the Kingdom of Yugoslavia, Vogošća can be said to have been a suitable place for excursions, and it was often visited by merchants and beys, some of whom also had their own cottages. In this period, the construction of the first industrial plants began, for which Vogošća later became known.

=== Socialist Federative Republic of Yugoslavia ===
During the 1980s the municipality of Vogošća recorded a stable and dynamic development and was recognizable by a very high level of industrial development. Vogošća was known as the second most developed municipality in the former Yugoslavia, i.e. the level of national income per capita. The development of the automotive industry and the roller bearing industry, which took place in cooperation with Volkswagen from Germany and SKF-Goteborg from Sweden, contributed to such a state to the greatest extent. In the economic structure of the wider region, mining and industry represented the dominant areas of the economy. The cooperation of the municipality of Vogošća with other countries in the pre-war period was at a high level. In addition to the developed infrastructure, local and intercity traffic, Vogošća has a developed telecommunications and PTT network with its own switchboard of 12,000 numbers, and its own RTV service with a transmitter.

=== Post-War Vogošća ===
Vogošća was heavily damaged during the exodus of the Serbs who controlled that territory during the war while its Bosniak population was expelled. The Dayton Agreement provided Vogošća to be a part of the Federation of Bosnia and Herzegovina. Today, Vogošća is rebuilding and its industries are on the rebound thanks to aid and funds, along with the construction of the military-industrial complex of the company "Pretis".

== Geography ==
The municipality of Vogošća covers 72 km [square km??] and is 6 km from the center of Sarajevo, 70 km from Zenica and 100 km from Tuzla, the largest consumer centers in the country. It has communication links, the main road Brod – Sarajevo – Metković, the main railway line Vinkovci (Croatia) – Sarajevo – Ploče (Adriatic Sea). The area has a developed infrastructure, electrical energy infrastructure, coal, natural gas, natural resources of the fertile valley of the Bosna River, etc. The population is optimal, and a high level of qualifications of all profiles of workers is represented.

== Industry ==
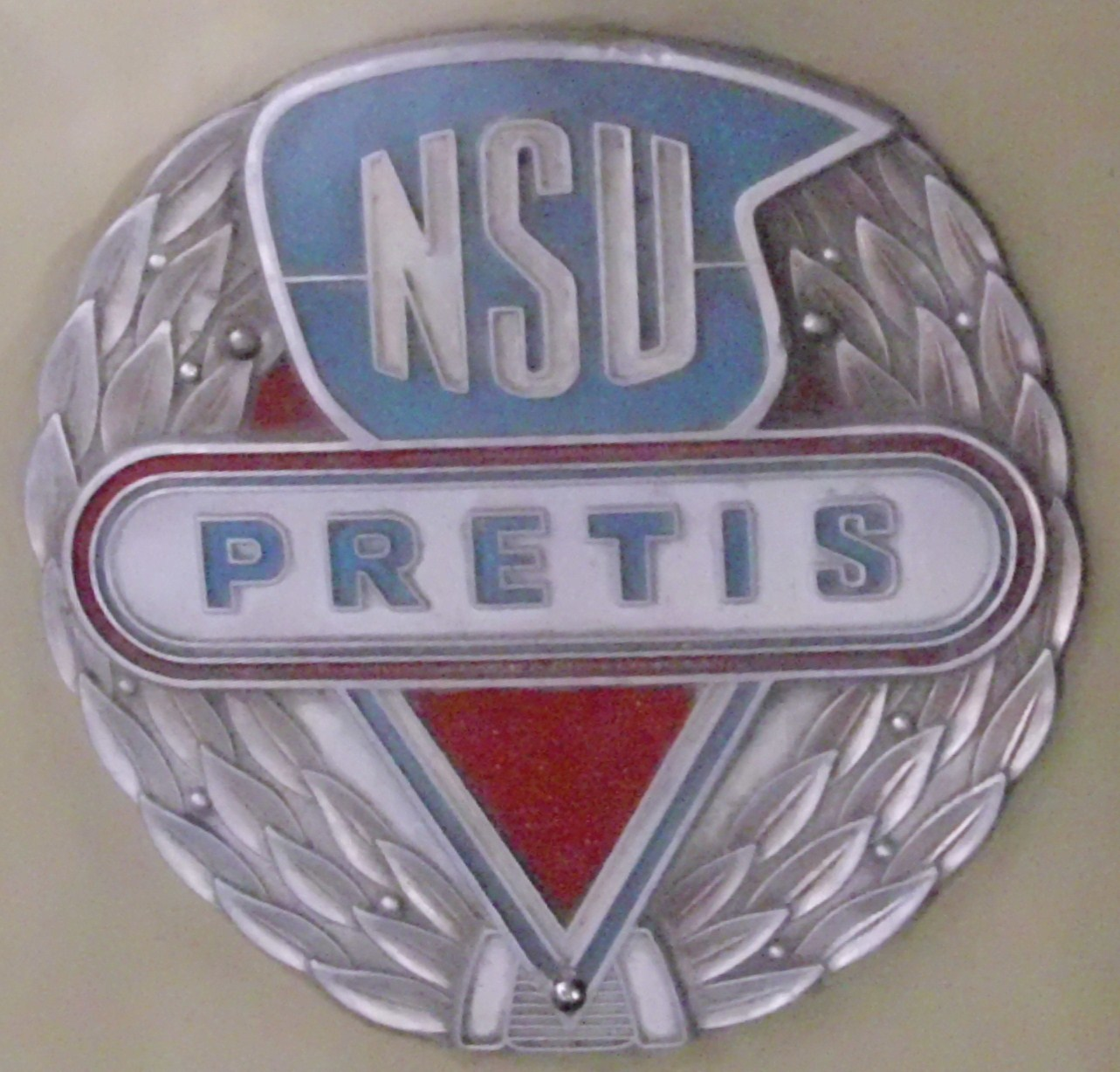
Emblem of NSU-Pretis

In 1948, PRETIS was founded in Vogošća as a state factory and became one of the largest and most modern ammunition factories in Europe. Together with three other military factories in 1967. became part of the holding company UNIS Sarajevo, which became the leader of the metal processing industry in Bosnia and Herzegovina with 50,000 employees. An example is the production capacity of artillery ammunition with about 1,000,000 units/year. One of those products is the well-known express cooking pot popularly called the Pretis pot.

During the socialist period, more than 11,000 workers worked at one of the largest factories of special purpose industry in the then SFRY. Today, barely around 300 people work there. After the war, the factory was divided into two parts by privatization, Unis Pretis and Pretis.

== Politics ==
The municipal mayor of Centar is Migdad Hasanović from the Party of Democratic Action.

The municipal council has 27 seats in total, which are allocated as follows:

1. Party of Democratic Action - 11 seats
2. Social Democratic Party - 5 seats
3. Democratic Front - 4 seats
4. People and Justice - 3 seats
5. Party for Bosnia and Herzegovina - 2 seats
6. Forward - 1 seat

== Notable people ==
- Senad Kreso, long-time football player, manager and coach of "Unis" ("Pretis" a)

== Demographics ==
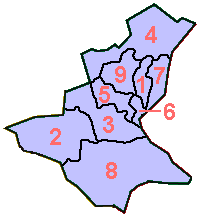
Vogošća is marked with number 9 on this map of the Sarajevo Canton.

=== 1971 ===
According to the 1971 population census there were 14,402 residents.

- 6,728 Serbs (46.71%)
- 5,938 Bosniaks (41.23%)
- 1,186 Croats (8.23%)
- 247 Yugoslavs (1.71%)
- 303 Others (2.12%)

=== 1991 ===
According to the 1991 population census there were 24,647 residents.

- 12,499 Bosniaks (50.71%)
- 8,813 Serbs (35.75%)
- 1,071 Croats (4.34%)
- 1,730 Yugoslavs (7.01%)
- 534 Others (2.19%)

=== 2013 ===
Population and ethnicity by settlement:

Settlement	Total	Ethnicity							
Settlement	Total	Bosniaks	%	Croats	%	Serbs	%	Others	%
Blagovac	1,956	1,842	94.2	15	0.8	64	3.3	35	1.8
Budišići	0	0	0	0	0	0	0	0	0
Donja Vogošća	406	333	82	1	0.2	19	4.7	53	13.1
Garež	22	22	100	0	0	0	0	0	0
Gora	281	265	94.3	6	2.1	9	3.2	1	0.4
Grahovište	93	74	79.6	1	1.1	3	3.2	15	16.1
Hotonj	4,580	4,372	95.5	19	0.4	37	0.8	152	3.3
Kamenica	98	64	65.3	26	26.5	1	1	7	7.1
Kobilja Glava	3,092	2,973	96.2	6	0.2	3	0.1	110	3.6
Kremeš	114	89	78.1	1	0.9	21	18.4	3	2.6
Krivoglavci	613	578	94.3	3	0.5	6	1	26	4.2
Ljubina-Poturovići	426	382	89.7	9	2.1	27	6.3	8	1.9
Nebočaj	424	342	80.7	4	0.9	15	3.5	63	14.9
Perca	0	0	0	0	0	0	0	0	0
Semizovac	790	688	87.1	21	2.7	19	2.4	62	7.8
Svrake	1,204	1,159	96.3	0	0	2	0.2	43	3.6
Tihovići	337	329	97.6	0	0	0	0	8	2.4
Uglješići	322	320	99.4	0	0	0	0	2	0.6
Ugorsko	1,017	990	97.3	6	0.6	0	0	21	2.1
Vogošća	10,568	9,529	90.2	203	1.9	316	3	520	4.9
Vrapče	0	0	0	0	0	0	0	0	0
Municipality total	26,343	24,351	92.4	321	1.2	542	2.1	1,129	4.3

== Twin towns – sister cities ==
Vogošća is twinned with:

- Çekmeköy, Turkey
- İzmit, Turkey
