= Order of the Golden Lily =

Bosnian military decoration

Order of the Golden Lily Orden Zlatnog ljiljana
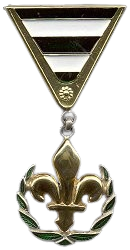

Awarded by the Army of the Republic of Bosnia and Herzegovina
- Type: State order
- Established: 1992
- Country: Republic of Bosnia and Herzegovina
- Eligibility: Citizens of the Republic of Bosnia and Herzegovina
- Criteria: "to the members of the armed forces who particularly stood out in armed opposition to the aggressor, contributed to the expansion of the free parts of the Republic, and performed several free acts in which their courage and sacrifice came to the fore, while the aggressor suffered considerable losses in manpower and material resources".
- Status: Defunct
- Classes: Order of the Golden Lily with a Golden Wreath (Orden zlatnog ljiljana sa zlatnim vijencem); Order of the Golden Lily with a Silver Wreath (Orden zlatnog ljiljana sa srebrenim vijencem)

Statistics
- Total inductees: 1742

Precedence
- Next (higher): Order of the Hero of the Liberation War
- Next (lower): Order of Freedom

The Order of the Golden Lily (Bosnian: Orden Zlatnog ljiljana), or simply the Golden Lily (Bosnian: Zlatni ljiljan), was a military decoration of the Army of the Republic of Bosnia and Herzegovina during the Bosnian War. It was given to soldiers and officers who displayed exceptional courage, bravery, and strategic skill during wartime.

Although initially, the Golden Lily was the highest war award, on April 14, 1994, the Presidency of the Republic of Bosnia and Herzegovina adopted the Decree on Decorations, which exclusively mentions the Order of the Hero of the Liberation War as the highest award.

1,742 people were awarded the Golden Lily.

== Award criteria ==
The Rulebook, established on October 1, 1992, outlines the criteria and procedures for granting the Golden Lily War award, and other relevant matters about its bestowal. According to that rulebook, the Golden Lily award was an individual as well as a collective recognition. With the adoption of the new Ordinance on awards and incentive measures in December 1992, collective awards were abolished and the only winners of collective awards are the Guards Brigade Delta and the Professional Fire Brigade Sarajevo.

The Order of Golden Lily was awarded to:

"to the members of the armed forces who particularly stood out in armed opposition to the aggressor, contributed to the expansion of the free parts of the Republic, and performed several free acts in which their courage and sacrifice came to the fore, while the aggressor suffered considerable losses in manpower and material resources".

== Meaning ==
The golden lily is a thousand-year-old symbol of Bosnia, an endemic flower characteristic to the region of Bosnia (Latin: Lilium bosniacum) which was used as a symbol of purity, innocence, and beauty. Many Bosnian heroes, from noble families to the royal Kotromanić dynasty, utilized it throughout history. Lily was also a feature of Bosnian courtyards and gardens, most often sung as zambak. A lily was also engraved on the sights of the Bosnian martyrs.

== Bearers of the Golden Lily ==
=== Known bearers ===
Some of the bearers of the Golden Lily badge became known to the wider public, either during the war or later as public servants:

- Dragan Vikić — police officer, war veteran, former athlete, former member of the Ministry of Internal Affairs of the RBiH and winner of the Sixth of April Sarajevo Award;
- Izet Nanić — Brigadier General, Commander of the 505th Bužim Knight Brigade of the 5th Corps of Army of RBiH. The Golden Lily badge was awarded to him in 1994;
- Jasmin Kulenović — Major, 501st Brigade (ARBiH), killed in action; The Golden Lily badge was awarded to him posthumously.
- Kemal Ademović — politician, director of the State Intelligence Agency during the war;
- Naser Orić — commander of units of the RBiH Army during the war in the Srebrenica area. He was awarded the Golden Lily badge in 1994;
- Nezim Halilović Muderris — imam from Bosnia and Herzegovina, Halilović received the Golden Lily badge in 1994 as a member of the 4th Muslim Light Brigade of the 4th Corps of the ARBiH;
- Sead Delić — General of the Army of the Republic of Bosnia and Herzegovina and the Army of the Federation of Bosnia and Herzegovina, known as one of the war commanders of the 2nd Corps of the Army of Bosnia and Herzegovina. Awarded the Golden Lily in 1995;
- Željko Komšić — politician, member of the Presidency of Bosnia and Herzegovina from among the Croats. He received the Order of the Golden Lily in 1995 as a member of the 101st Mountain Brigade of the 1st Corps of the ARBiH.

== Gallery ==
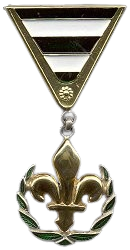
Order of the Golden Lily

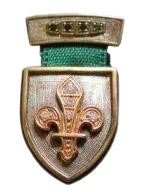
Badge

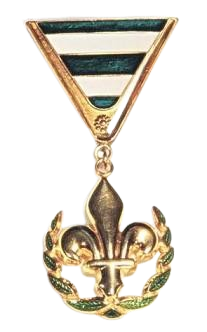
The Golden Lily order with a golden wreath

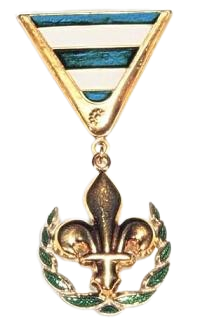
The Golden Lily order with a silver wreath

== See also ==
- Order of the Hero of the Liberation War
