= History of the Army of the Republic of Bosnia and Herzegovina =

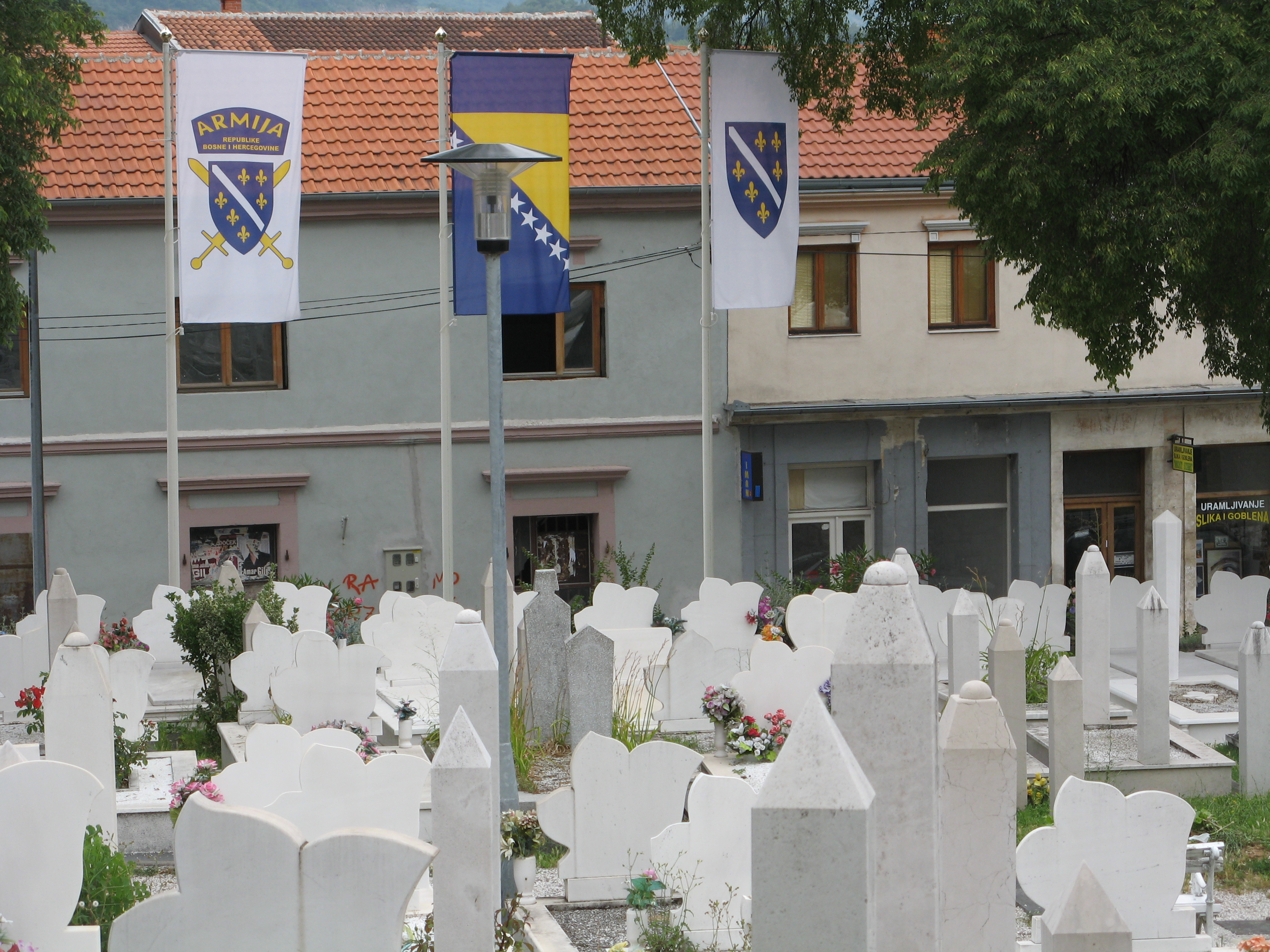
A cemetery in Mostar flying the flag of Army of the Republic of Bosnia and Herzegovina (left), the flag of Bosnia and Herzegovina, and the flag of the Republic of Bosnia and Herzegovina

This section is about the history of the Army of the Republic of Bosnia and Herzegovina that existed from 1992 to 1995, then it was formed into two armies of the two entities from 1998 to 2005 and finally transformed into the Armed Forces of Bosnia and Herzegovina (OSBIH).

== History ==
=== Territorial Defence ===
In 1988 the Yugoslav Army had placed the Bosnian provincial Territorial Defence Force under the 1 Military District (Belgrade), and reduced its strength two-thirds to 86,362 in December 1991. The Bosnian TO was gained control by the Bosnian-Serb SDS in the coalition government. On 19 December 1990 Alija Izetbegović and the SDA party alarmed by the SDS's secessionists attitudes discussed forming an independent Bosnian army later Army of the Republic of Bosnia and Herzegovina. In March 1991 Sefer Halilović formed the Patriotic League (Patriotska Liga - PL) as an independent Bosnian army, with the same territorial organization as the TO.

It was in early 1992 that the JNA, Bosnian-Serb and Serbian paramilitary militias began attacking Bosnian-Muslim and Bosnian-Croat towns and villages the first ones being Sarajevo by the JNA and Bijeljina by paramilitary forces. On 4 April, Alija Izetbegović ordered general mobilization: and on 8 April he transformed the Sarajevo TO command into GHQ of the Teritorijalna Odbrana Republike Bosne i Hercegovine (Territorial Defence Force of the Republic of Bosnia and Herzegovina) (TORBIH), appointing the Bosnian-Muslim Colonel Hasan Efendić as commander of the army, Colonel Stjepan Šiber, a Bosnian-Croat, became chief-of-staff, and Colonel Jovan Divjak, a Bosnian-Serb, his deputy. The TO was formally established on 15 April when all Patriotic League units joined the force. On 20 May 1992 the TORBIH, PL, and other militias and the Bosnian-Croat HVO and HOS were officially united as Armed Forces of the Republic of Bosnia-Herzegovina (Oruzane Snage Republike Bosne i Hercegovine). On 23 May Colonel Efendić was replaced as commander by Sefer Halilović.

=== Army of the Republic of Bosnia and Herzegovina ===
On 20 May 1992 the TORBIH was renamed Armija Republike Bosne i Hercegovine (Army of the Republic of Bosnia and Herzegovina) - ARBIH, usually abbreviated ABIH. In November 1993, Sefer Halilović was replaced as commander of ABIH by Rasim Delić.

==== Organization 1992–1994 ====
The ARBIH, now around 80,000 strong was reorganized on 18 August 1992 into a more conventional structure. Initially four corps were created: 1st Corps (Sarajevo); 2nd Corps (Tuzla) in northern Bosnia; 3rd Corps (Zenica) and 4th Corps (Mostar) in Herzegovina; the Eastern Bosnian Operational Group in the eastern enclaves of Goražde. 5th Corps (Bihać) was established on 21 October 1992 from the Una-Sana Operational Group to defend the North-Western Bosnian enclave. The 7th Corps (Travnik) was established on 7 April 1994 with brigades from the 3rd Corps to advance north-westward through southern Bosnia. The 6th Corps (Konjic) was formed in June 1993 from the 4th Corps Northern Herzegovina Operational Group, to occupy northern Hercegovina from the HVO and eventually reach the Adriatic coast.

Each corps controlled a number of brigades, independent battalions and companies. Brigades were designed as infantry, mountain, motorized or light and given new three digit numbers, the first number indicating the corps. The larger corps (1st, 2nd and 3rd) comprised 15 Operationa Groups, each with 3–7 brigades. From August 1992 to December 1994 about 105 brigades were formed or reformed in the 1-527 series: 48 infantry or undesigned, 41 mountain, 10 motorized and 6 light, but not all brigades existed at the same time. There were also single commando and reconnaissance, Military Police battalions and artillery brigades: the various independent units included the Delta SF Unit, four commando detachments, six Corps HQ MP battalions, a mixed artillery battalion and an independent armoured company. Eight Bosnian-Croat HVO units were incorporated into the ARBiH. Crni Labudovi was a PL unit formed in April 1992 from refugees in Konjic under the 4th Corps (later 1st Corps), they eventually numbered 800 men and earned a reputation for battlefield bravery.

Some PL units after the absorption by the TORBIH still operated independently. PL personnel wore "Green Berets" as did many ABIH units. The ABIH assigned 15 mixed aircraft to corps HQs to supply 5th corps in Bihac and 2nd corps in the Goražde, Srebrenica and Žepa area. The Bosnian Police (Policija Republike Bosne i Hercegovine) were formed in 1992 from districts under Bosnian control and there was a Bosnian Special Police Unit (specijalna jedinica). There were no naval forces.

==== Organization 1995 ====
In January 1995 the ARBIH now expanded to 200,000 reorganized. The Operational Groups in the 1st, 2nd, 3rd and 7th Corps were redesigned as divisions, each division comprising 3–6 brigades, but the 4th and 5th Corps kept their brigades and structure. It was a much improved fighting force.

== Commanders ==
=== April 1992 – May 1992 ===
TORBIH GHQ, Sarajevo

- Colonel Hasan Efendić (Commander of the TO RBiH)
- Colonel Jovan Divjak (Deputy Commander)
- Colonel Stjepan Šiber (Chief of Staff)

=== May 1992 – November 1993 ===
ARBIH GHQ, Sarajevo

- Alija Izetbegović (Commander-in-chief of the ARBIH)
- General Sefer Halilović (Chief of Staff of the Main Staff; Commander of ARBIH)
- General Stjepan Šiber (Deputy Commander of Main Staff)
- General Jovan Divjak (Chief of Staff)

=== November 1993 – December 1995 ===
ARBIH GHQ, Sarajevo

- Alija Izetbegović (Commander-in-chief of the ARBIH)
- General Rasim Delić (Commander of Main/General Staff; Commander of ARBIH)
- General Enver Hadžihasanović (Chief of Staff of the Main/General Staff)
- General Jovan Divjak (Deputy Commander, responsible for all matters concerning civilians)

== Equipment ==
In 1995 the ARBIH had about 40 tanks, 30 APCs.

== See also ==
- Bosnian War
- Army of Republic of Bosnia and Herzegovina
- Republic of Bosnia and Herzegovina
