= Dževad Galijašević =

Bosnian political analyst and counterterrorism expert (born 1962)

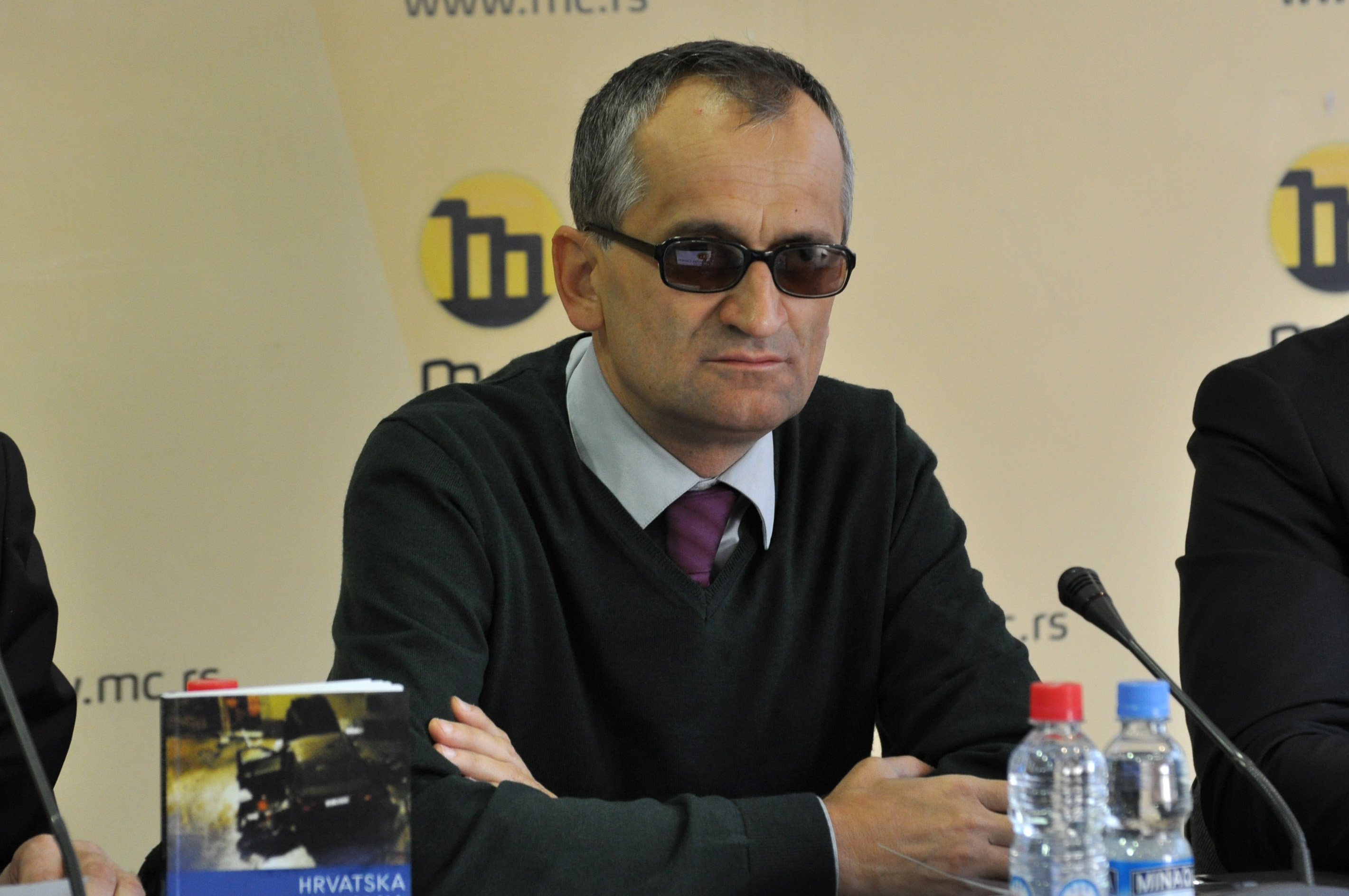
- Galijašević in 2012

Personal details
- Born: 4 March 1962 (age 64) Moševac, Maglaj, Socialist Republic of Bosnia and Herzegovina
- Party: Party for Bosnia and Herzegovina (SBiH)
- Occupation: Political commentator, politician

Dževad Galijašević (born 4 March 1962) is a Bosnian political commentator and former politician.

== Biography ==
Galijašević was born on 4 March 1962 in Moševac, Maglaj, in the Socialist Republic of Bosnia and Herzegovina. In his youth, he was a member of the League of Communists of Yugoslavia. Upon completing a stint in the Yugoslav People's Army, Galijašević went on to study security and national defense studies at the Faculty of Political Science of University of Sarajevo, but is widely rumored to have never completed his studies.

In 1988, Galijašević ran for election to the local leadership of Moševac, but the Maglaj municipal authorities deemed him ineligible on the grounds that he was morally and politically unsuitable. Later, while attending a public meeting on human rights and liberties in Bosnia and Herzegovina, he criticized local leaders in Maglaj. He was arrested immediately after the meeting and served seven months in prison, during which he began a hunger strike that prompted human rights organizations to call for his pardon. The Presidency of Bosnia and Herzegovina pardoned him on 27 January 1989.

During the Bosnian War, Galijašević joined the Army of the Republic of Bosnia and Herzegovina, where he served as an officer in the 3rd Corps.

In 1999, Galijašević was appointed president of the Maglaj branch of the Party for Bosnia and Herzegovina; he was elected mayor of the municipality in 2000. As mayor, he ordered the evactuation of approximately 1,500 Bosnian mujahideen occupying Serb homes in Gornja Bočinja to be vacated, but the order was never carried out. In September 2006, he was attacked twice and relocated his family to Croatia. In November 2006, he alleged that Izetbegović-ally Haris Silajdžić "was the organizer and sponsor of mujahedin coming into Bosnia." In 2007, he became head of the municipal administration of Maglaj.

Since the mid-2000s, Galijašević has described himself as a "counter-terrorism" and "foreign affairs" expert, although according to some reports, he is widely regarded as a surrogate for the Serb nationalist government of Milorad Dodik in Banja Luka. In 2015, Bosnian media reported that Galijašević was on a permanent retainer with the Dodik government.

In 2010, his 15-year-old son was beaten by a 52-year-old man, reportedly because of his "father working for Chetniks (Serbs)". He has stated that Bosnia and Herzegovina is the most dangerous point in Europe in terms of the threat posed by jihadist terrorism.

Due to his pronounced strabismus, he frequently wears sunglasses in public.

== Controversies ==
Dragan Mektić, Minister of Security of Bosnia and Herzegovina, described Galijašević as a "quasi-expert and warmonger".

Galijašević and the Radio Televizija Republike Srpske were fined by the Konjic Municipal Court for presenting inaccurate information about Adnan Dlakić, an official at the Ministry of Security of Bosnia and Herzegovina. Galijašević had alleged that Dlakić was a former member of the Bosnian mujaheddin detachment; however, records found that Dlakić only joined the army in 2002.

According to several sources, Galijašević has repeatedly made claims that were described as conspiracy theories that were later reported by the media as news. He promoted several stories that were later found to be false or fabricated. The fact-checking platform Raskrinkavanje stated that Galijašević was known for presenting "unverified and false facts". In an interview with Balkan Info, he described the COVID-19 pandemic as a "terrorist concept".

== Works ==
- Hrvatska kriminalna hobotnica (2012)
- Sluge tranzicije i komunizma: priča o krizi identiteta i komunističkoj diktaturi u BiH (2012)
- Era terorizma u BiH (2007)
- Moševac: što je bilo - bilo je (1989)

== Sources ==
- Deliso, Christopher (2007). The Coming Balkan Caliphate: The Threat of Radical Islam to Europe and the West. Greenwood Publishing Group. pp. 20–. ISBN 978-0-275-99525-6.
