= Galijašević =

Galijašević is a Bosnian Muslim surname. There is an old family of Galijašević in Tešanj. There were beys with the surname during the Austro-Hungarian rule in Bosnia and Herzegovina. Two members of the Tešanj family were members of pro-Serb Muslim organization Gajret. Two Galijašević from Mala Kladuša joined the Yugoslav Partisan 8th Kordun Division, and both were killed in battle in 1945. There is a village, Galijaševići, located in northwestern Bosnia and Herzegovina. It may refer to:

- Dževad Galijašević, Bosnian political analyst, expert on terrorism, from Moševac.
- Senad Galijašević, known as "Senna M", Bosnian-Croatian retired musician, from Vitez.
- Ismet Galijašević, director of Bosnia's Institute for Standardization, Metrology, and Patents in 1996.
- Zijad Galijašević, Bosnian electro-technical engineer
- Galibedin Galijašević, Croatian doctor, specialist in family medicine
