= Supreme Command of the Army of the Republic of Bosnia and Herzegovina =

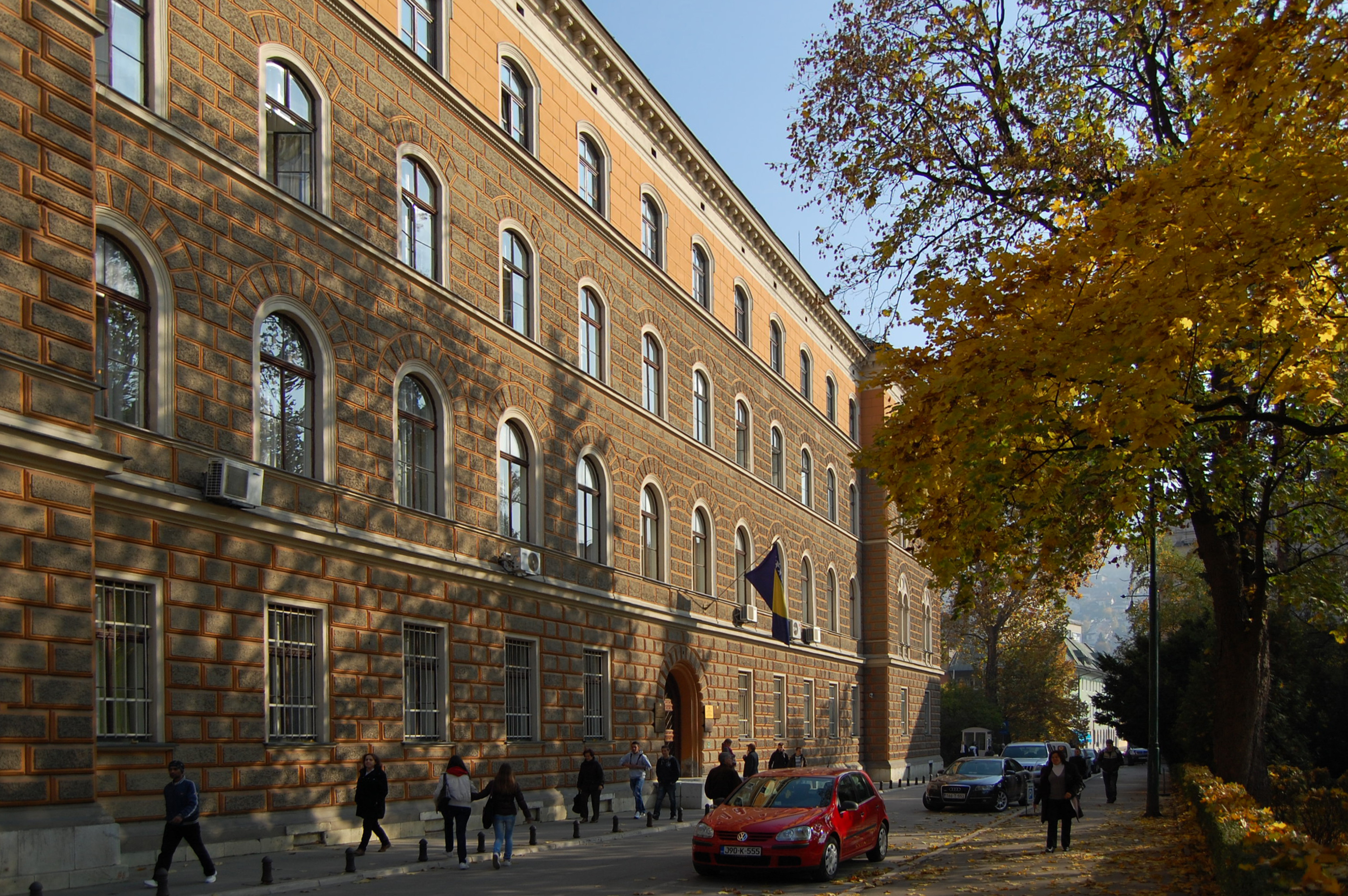
The Presidency Building in central Sarajevo

The Supreme Command of the Army of the Republic of Bosnia and Herzegovina (Bosnian: Štab Vrhovne Komande Armije Republike Bosne i Hercegovine) was the supreme command of the Army of the Republic of Bosnia and Herzegovina and it was headquartered in the Presidency Building in Sarajevo.

== Creation ==
The main staff was transformed from the Bosnian territorial defence chiefs of staff and Patriotic League general staff

=== Commanders ===
Sefer Halilović served as the supreme ABiH commander until 8 June 1993 and his title was Chief of Staff of the Main Staff of the ARBiH. On this date, the President of the Republic of Bosnia and Herzegovina, Alija Izetbegović, issued a decision "restructuring […] the […] supreme command headquarters of the armed forces" ("8 June 1993 decision").This decision provides:

- The post of the Commander of the Main Staff of the Armed Forces of the Republic of Bosnia and Herzegovina shall be established.
- The post of the Chief of the Main Staff of the Armed Forces of the Republic of Bosnia and Herzegovina shall be retained.

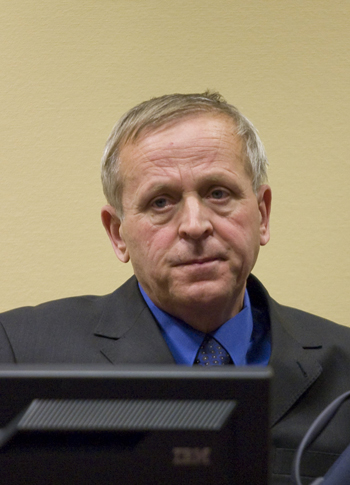
Rasim Delić

The decision further "appointed" Rasim Delić to the post of Commander of the Main Staff of the ARBiH and "appointed" Sefer Halilović as Chief of Staff of the Main Staff.In addition, the decision established two Deputy Commander positions to which Stjepan Šiber and Jovan Divjak were appointed, but were already serving in the Main Staff.

Approximately six weeks later, on 18 July 1993, President Alija Izetbegović issued a decision further restructuring the ABiH ("18 July decision"). According to this decision, during a state of war the Presidency of the Republic was the Supreme Command of the Armed Forces of the Republic.The decision provides that "The Republic of Bosnia and Herzegovina Army consists of the Main Staff and eight Corps.", although only 7 corps were formed. All the Corps were directly subordinate to the Commander of the Main Staff.

On 24 October 1994 the Main Staff was renamed the General Staff.

== Main Staff/General Staff organization ==
The Main Staff/General Staff of the ARBiH had various administrations which oversaw the work of their counterparts services in the Army Corps and subordinate units within the Corps that were the brigades and in the brigades the battalions, along with independent battalions.

- Administrations in the Main Staff/General Staff:
  - Security and Intelligence Administration (DB), highest security organ within the ARBiH,
    - Military Security Service (SVB), the military service: department head Fikret Muslimović, then department head Jusuf Jašarević and later Kerim Lučarević
  - Operative Planning Administration: department head brig. gen. Vahid Karavelić
  - Inspection Department:
  - RV and PVO Command (Air Defense Administration/Command): department head Ešref Nurkić
  - Headquarters Administration:
  - Combat Arms Administration:
  - Administration for Operations: department head Mirsad Čaušević
  - Administration for Professional Soldiers and Professional Service: department head Džemo Merdan
  - Administration for Finance: department head brig. gen. Hamzalija Hotić
  - Administration for Moral: department head Fikret Muslimović (after leaving the post of SVB)
  - Administration for Logistics:
  - Administration for Finance and Planning (Expanding the Army):
  - Administration for Organized Mobilization Work: department head brig. Avdo Kajević
  - Administration for Education:
    - Officer School:

== Main Staff/General Staff Headquarters ==
The Main Staff/General Staff was located in various buildings in Sarajevo. Due to ongoing communications problems within the besieged city, a major part of the Main Staff/General Staff was relocated to Kakanj, about 40 kilometers from Sarajevo, on 2 January 1994. The command post in Kakanj (KM Kakanj) was operational until the end of the war.

The offices of the Commander of the Main Staff/General Staff was located in Sarajevo center. The offices of the Chief of Staff of the Main Staff/General Staff were located in Sarajevo, but moved to KM Kakanj in early 1994.

== Staff Command ==
- Alija Izetbegović – as president, the Supreme Commander of the Army.
- Sefer Halilović – Commander of the Army and Chief of Staff of the Main Staff (25 May 1992 – 1 November 1993), Deputy Commander (8 June 1993 – 1 November 1993)
- Rasim Delić – Commander of the Army and Commander of the Main Staff/General Staff (8 June 1993 – 1995)
- Enver Hadžihasanović – Chief of Staff of the Main Staff/General Staff (1 November 1993 – 1995)
- Jovan Divjak – Deputy Chief to the Commander, responsible for civilians,
- Stjepan Šiber – Deputy Chief to the Commander, responsible for the immediate security of Sarajevo.
