= Building of the Presidency of Bosnia and Herzegovina =

Presidency Building
- Zgrada Predsjedništva; Зграда Предсједништва
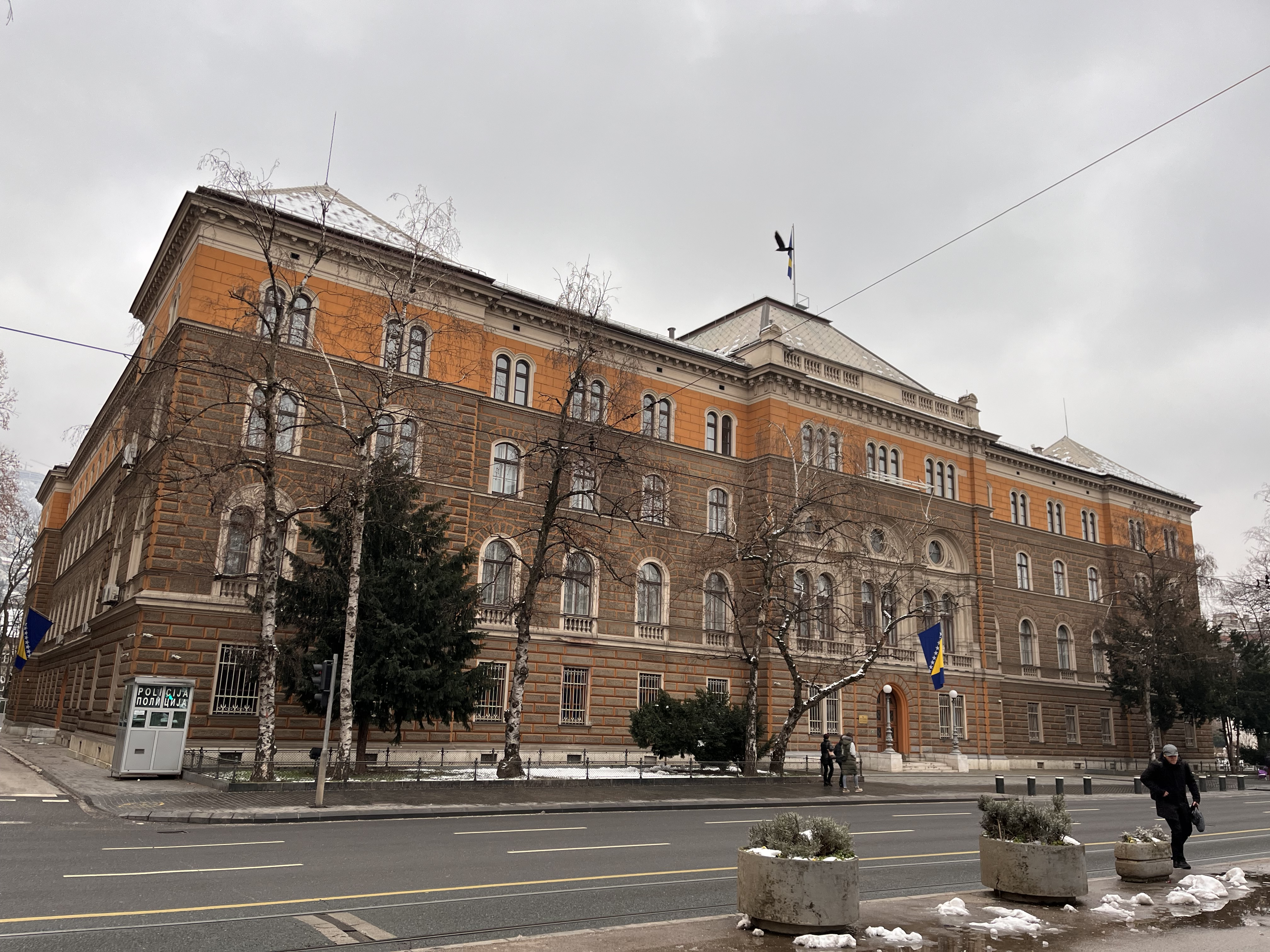
- The Presidency building of Bosnia and Herzegovina
- Interactive map of the Presidency Building area

General information
- Type: Official residence
- Architectural style: Renaissance
- Location: Centar Municipality, Sarajevo, Marshal Tito street 16, Bosnia and Herzegovina
- Coordinates: 43.8578°N 18.41412°E
- Current tenants: Presidency of Bosnia and Herzegovina
- Construction started: 1884
- Completed: 1886
- Owner: Council of Ministers of Bosnia and Herzegovina

Design and construction
- Architect: Josip Vancaš

Website
- predsjednistvobih.ba/zgr-konak

The Presidency Building (or the Building of the Presidency; Serbo-Croatian: Zgrada Predsjedništva / Зграда Предсједништва) is the official residence of the Presidency of Bosnia and Herzegovina, located in the Centar Municipality of Sarajevo, in Bosnia and Herzegovina.

The Bosnian government departments are also located there, including the Archive of Bosnia and Herzegovina and some government ministries. The building is also the seat of the Constitutional Court of Bosnia and Herzegovina.

== History ==
After the Austro-Hungarian campaign in Bosnia and Herzegovina in 1878, the occupation administration required a headquarters in central Sarajevo to house various staff and military personnel. The new government building was commissioned by the first mayor of Sarajevo Mustafa Fadilpašić and designed by architect Josip Vancaš in Renaissance style, and was constructed from 1884 to 1886. The building remained as the headquarters of the Austro-Hungarian regime in the area, housing government and military departments, as well as law courts and ceremonial rooms.

After World War I, the building became the government headquarters of the Drina Banovina province in the Kingdom of Yugoslavia. After World War II, the building became the official residence of the President of the Socialist Republic of Bosnia and Herzegovina (within Yugoslavia), as well as the home of the Executive Committee of the People's Assembly. During the Bosnian War, the building was used by the Supreme Command of the Army of the Republic of Bosnia and Herzegovina as its military headquarters. The building suffered external and internal damage during the war which was subsequently restored.

Since 1996, the building has been used as the official residence of the collective Presidency of Bosnia and Herzegovina. All of the collective heads of state use the building as their main residence in Sarajevo, as well as their ceremonial and working office. Some government departments are also located there, including the Archive of Bosnia and Herzegovina, as well as the Constitutional Court of Bosnia and Herzegovina.

The building is also used for state and ceremonial functions, as well as receptions and meetings with visiting foreign dignitaries and heads of state.

During the 2014 unrest in Bosnia and Herzegovina, the windows of the Presidency Building were broken with stones thrown by protesters who viewed the structure as a potent symbol of Bosnia and Herzegovina's chronic dysfunction; part of the building was also set on fire.

== Gallery ==
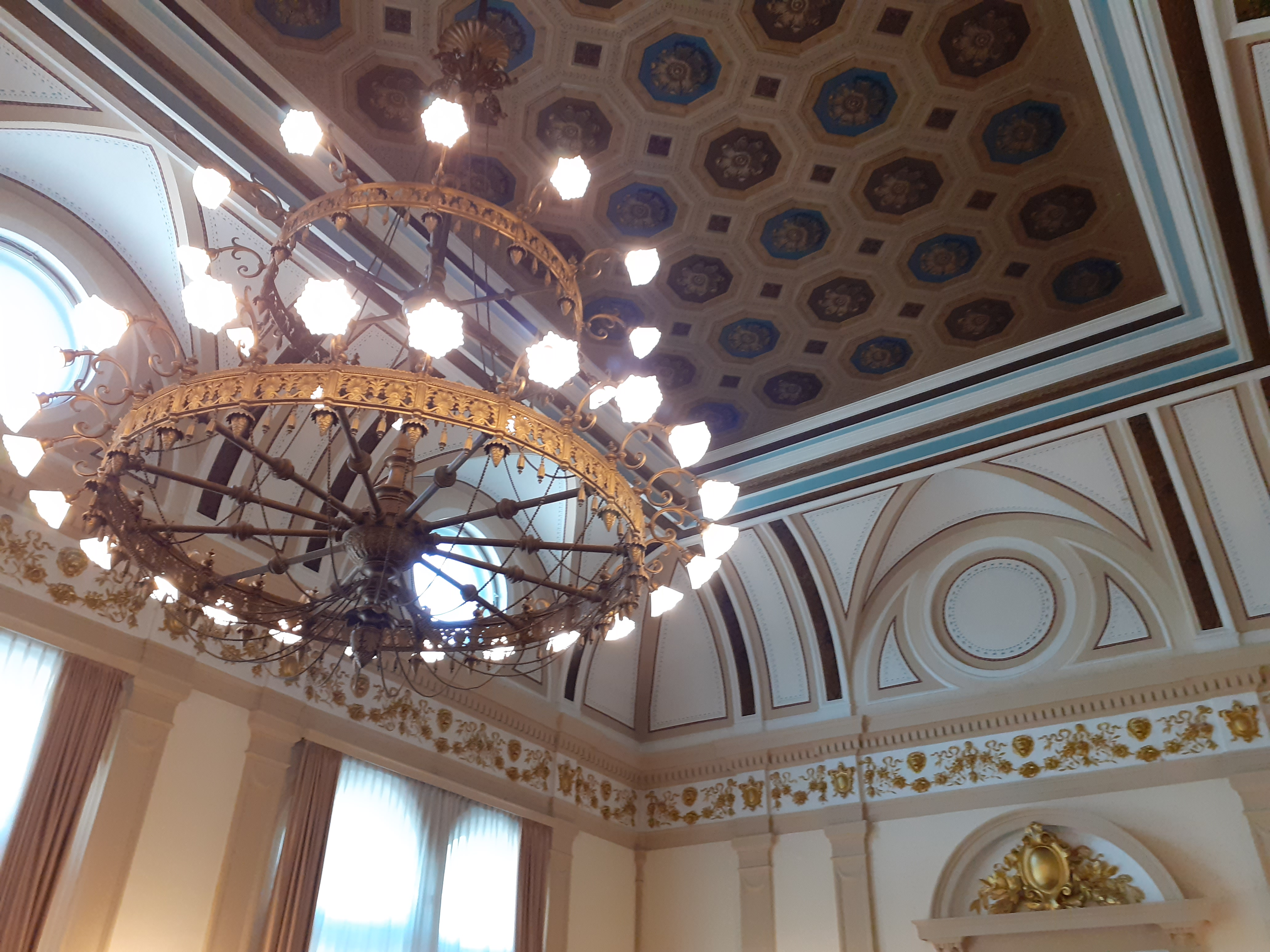
Presidency, interiors

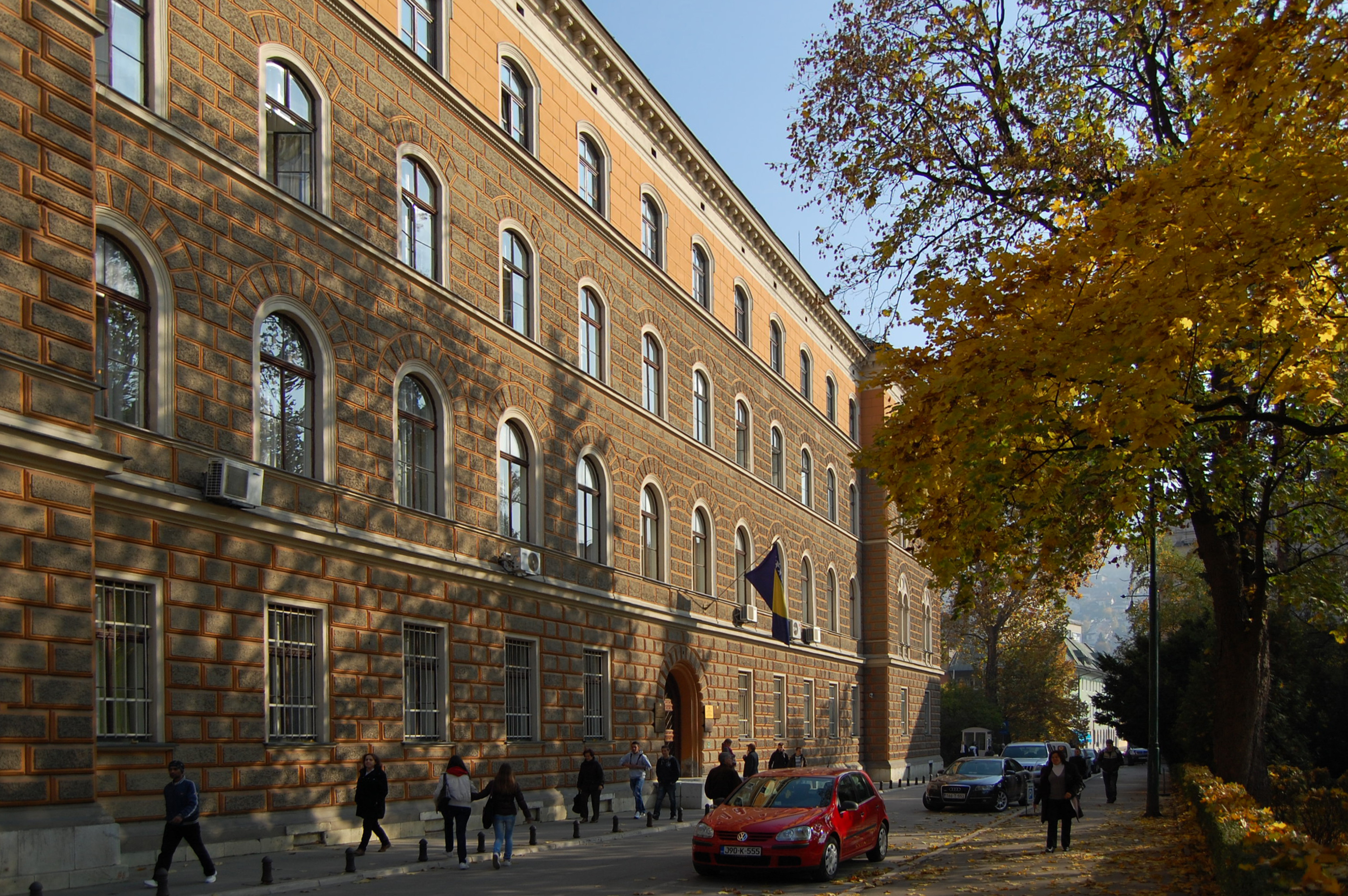
Presidency, side street

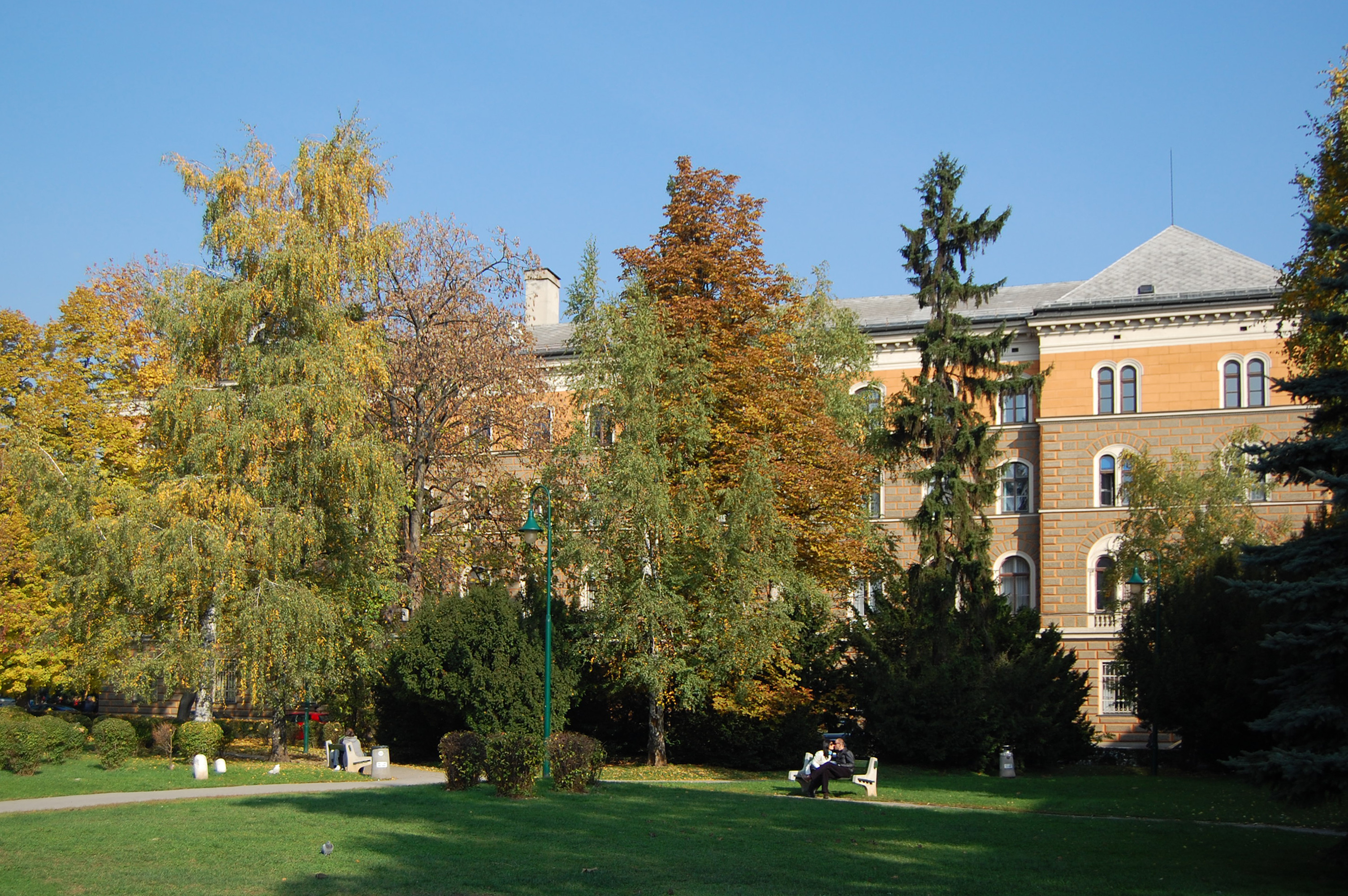
Presidency, park
