= Mustafa Hajrulahović Talijan =

Bosnia and Herzegovina army general (1957–1998)

Mustafa Hajrulahović
- Nickname: Talijan
- Born: 22 January 1957; Banja Luka, PR Bosnia and Herzegovina, FPR Yugoslavia
- Died: 8 March 1998 (aged 41) Hamburg, Germany
- Allegiance: Yugoslavia; Bosnia and Herzegovina
- Branch: Yugoslav Navy; Army of the Republic of Bosnia and Herzegovina
- Service years: 1979–1998
- Rank: Divisional general
- Commands: 1st Corps of the Army of the Republic of Bosnia and Herzegovina
- Conflicts: Bosnian War; Siege of Sarajevo
- Awards: BIH Order of the Gold Coat of Arms

Mustafa Hajrulahović "Talijan" (22 January 1957 – 8 March 1998) was a Yugoslav military officer and later a general of the Army of the Republic of Bosnia and Herzegovina, in charge of the defence of Sarajevo.

He graduated from the military academy in Split, Croatia in 1979. In 1991, he left the JNA with the rank of Corvette captain and deserted to the Army of the Republic of Bosnia and Herzegovina. For most of the war, he was the commander of the 1st Corps, but at the end of the war, he was placed in the war Presidency of Bosnia and Herzegovina. He was very popular in the army and with the people. He was one of the key people in the defense of Sarajevo during the Bosnian War, in a city besieged and helpless amid a relentless onslaught of artillery and sniper fire.

Hajrulahović died of a heart attack when he was visiting his mother in Hamburg, Germany. He was buried in a specially marked grave near Ali Pasha Mosque in Sarajevo.
