= Bočinja =

Bočinja may refer to:

- Donja Bočinja, a village in the municipality of Maglaj, Bosnia and Herzegovina
- Gornja Bočinja, a village in the municipality of Maglaj, Bosnia and Herzegovina
