= 81st Podrinje Independent Division =

81st Independent Division - Podrinje
- 81. divizija KoV
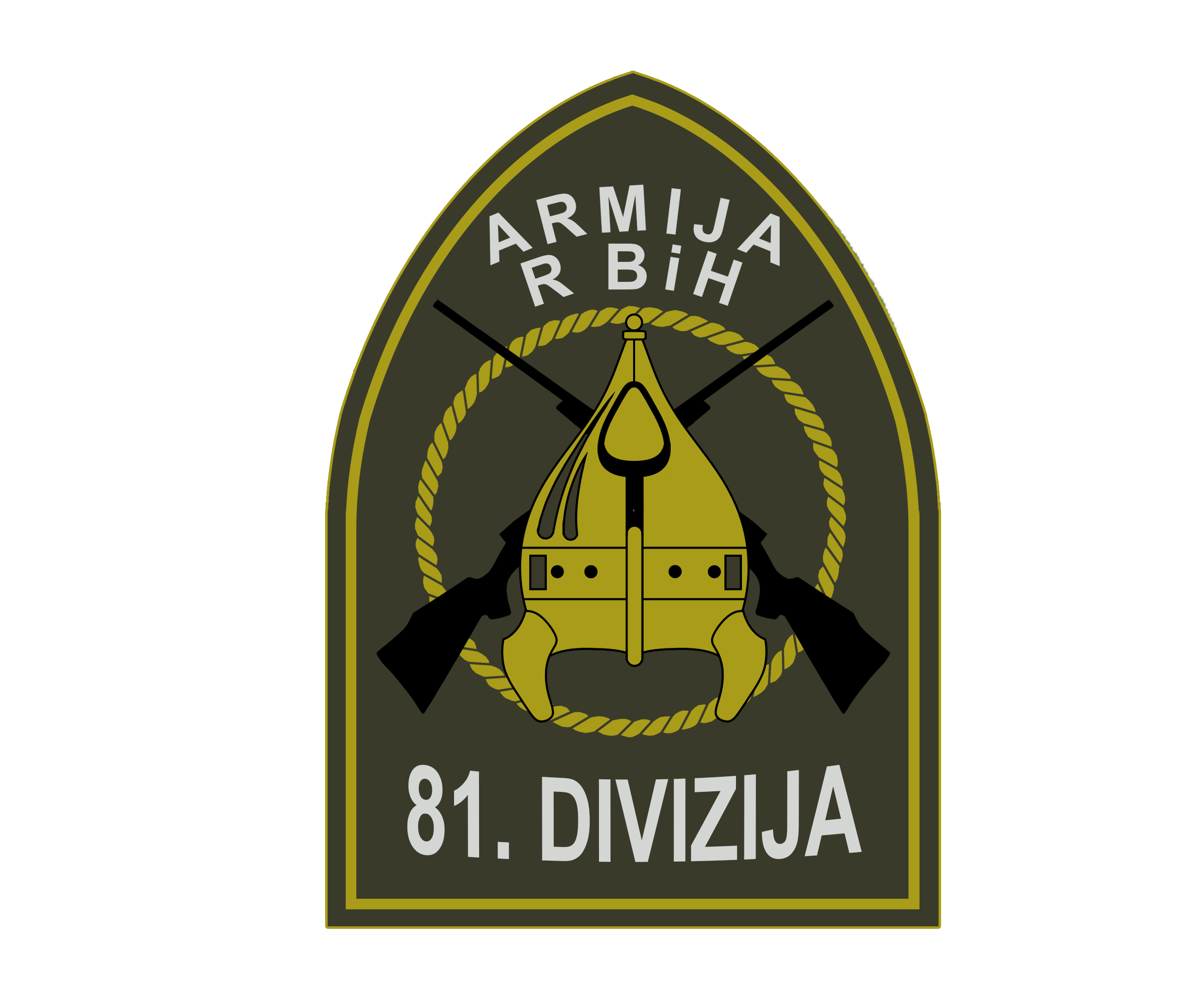
- Emblem of the 81st Independent Division
- Active: November 1, 1992 - 1995
- Country: Republic of Bosnia and Herzegovina
- Branch: Army
- Type: Army Division
- Role: Land warfare
- Size: 7,724 personnel
- Part of: Army of the Republic of Bosnia and Herzegovina
- Garrison/HQ: Goražde
- Anniversaries: February 4th
- Engagements: Bosnian War; Operation Laufer '92; Operation Krug '92; Operation Drina '92; Operation Zajedno '93; Operation Mač '93; Operation Star '94; Siege of Goražde

Commanders
- 1st Commander: Ferid Buljubašić
- 2nd Commander: Hamid Bahto

The 81st Independent Division (Podrinje) (Bosnian: 81. divizija KoV), formerly the East Bosnian Operational Group (Bosnian: Istočnobosanska operativna grupa (IBOG)) was a military unit of the Army of the Republic of Bosnia and Herzegovina, active during the tumultuous breakup of Yugoslavia and the ensuing Bosnian War.

Established during the early stages of the Bosnian War, in May and June of 1992, six brigades were formed on the free territory around Goražde: 1st Foča Brigade; 1st Drina Brigade, 31st Drina Assault Brigade, 43rd Drina Brigade, 1st Rogatica Brigade and 1st Višegrad Brigade.

The command of these units was unified under the District Headquarters of the Territorial Defense (Bosnian: Okružni štab teritorijalne odbrane) in Goražde. The brigades were organized in different formations, with troop numbers ranging from 900 to 3,200 soldiers. Only around 30% of the soldiers were equipped with weapons. These brigades were not structured according to a unified formation, and initially, they lacked logistical and support units. Formed on a territorial basis, they did not have fully developed functions or command structures at the brigade and battalion levels. Instead, they were a product of the people’s efforts to self-organize for defense, reflecting the specific conditions and needs of the areas where they were established.

In order to better organise military officers from the region requested from the General Staff of the Army of the Republic of Bosnia and Herzegovina to provide them with a number of professional officer personnel, which had been in short supply up to that point. In response to this request, the General Staff sent Ferid Buljubašić, a former major during his service in the Yugoslav People's Army (JNA), to Goražde in October 1992. His task was to improve the professional command structure with his knowledge and to make the defensive units in the Goražde region more organized.

On November 1, 1992, all military units of the Army of the Republic of Bosnia and Herzegovina in the Goražde region were unified under a single command. On that day, the East Bosnian Operational Group (IBOG) was established, with its headquarters in Goražde. It was part of the 1st Corps of the Army of the Republic of Bosnia and Herzegovina, and Ferid Buljubašić was appointed as its first commander.

The decision to form the East Bosnian Operational Group (IBOG) was issued by the Supreme Command Headquarters on September 27, 1992.

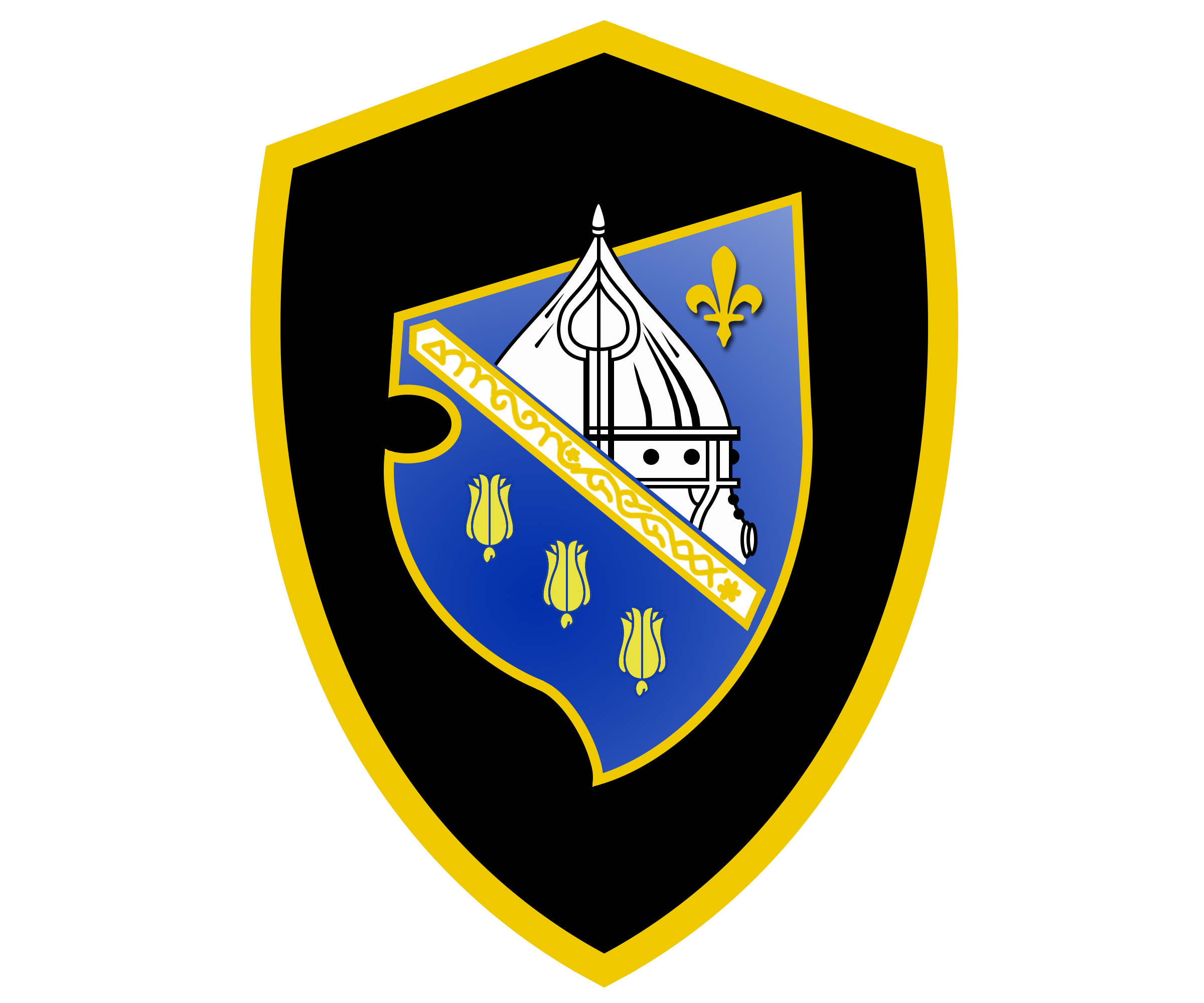
81st Podrinje Independent Division - Military Police Emblem

== Role ==
The formation of the East Bosnian Operational Group marked a decisive shift from a loosely coordinated system of locally organized brigades toward a more coherent and centrally managed command structure. The main task of IBOG was to provide unified command and control over all units operating within the Goražde enclave, integrating Territorial Defense formations, brigade staffs, and supporting elements under a single operational framework. This unification significantly enhanced the organizational efficiency, operational discipline, and coordination capacity of the defending forces in Eastern Bosnia.

In essence, the primary mission of the Eastern Bosnian Operational Group was to unify and coordinate the defensive operations in Goražde. It established the framework for an organized and sustained resistance, ensured operational cohesion among the various military units, and managed the logistical and administrative structures required for the enclave to endure the prolonged siege and combat pressures imposed by the Army of Republika Srpska, with support from Serbia.

== Structure ==
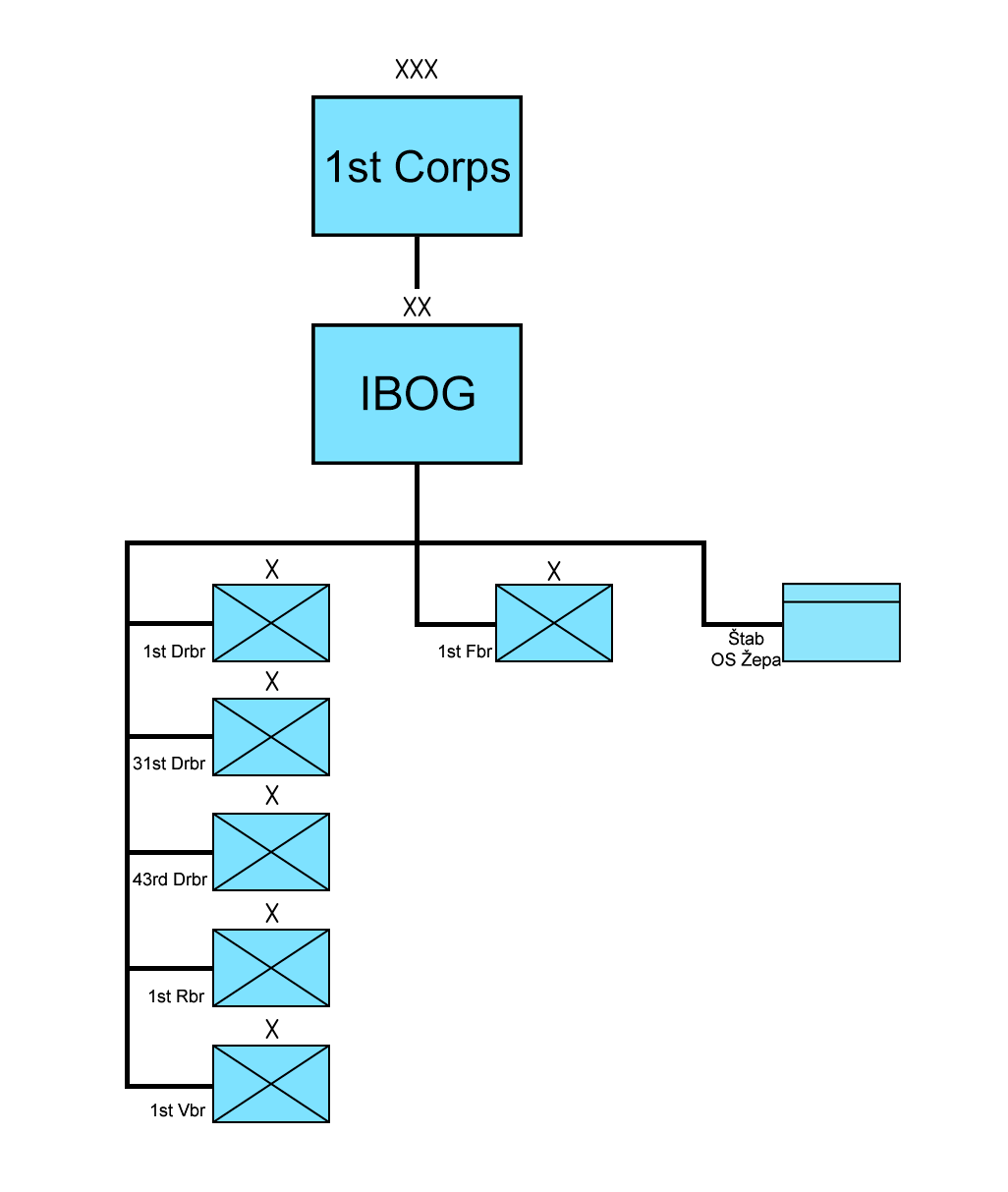
Structure of the East Bosnia Operational Group, October 1992.

Apart from minor changes, the structure of the East Bosnian Operational Group (IBOG), until the end of 1994, stayed the same and is as follows:

Commander

Chief of Staff - Directly Commands:

- Command Post
- Reconnaissance and Sabotage Company
- Signals Section
- Assistant Chief of Staff for Intelligence
- Assistant Chief of Staff for Operations
- Assistant Chief of Staff for Organizational and Mobilization Affairs
- All Section Chiefs

Commander’s Assistant for Morale - Oversight of:

- Press Service
- Military Court
- Commission for Prisoner-of-War Exchange

Commander’s Assistant for Security - Supervises:

- Military Police Company
- Military Investigative Body
- Military Prison / Detention Facility

Commander’s Assistant for Logistics - Responsible for:

- Logistics Base
- War Hospital

Brigades

1st Drina Brigade

- Formation Date: 18 May 1992
  - Commander: Zaim Imamović
- 31st Drina Assault Brigade
- Formation Date: 25 May 1992
  - First Commander: Abduselam Sijerčić

1st Višegrad Brigade

- Formation Date: 29 May 1992
  - Commander: Ahmet Sejdić

43rd Drina Brigade

- Formation Date: 6 June 1992
  - First Commander: Amir Reko (“Macedonian”)

1st Rogatica Brigade

- Formation Date: 19 November 1992
  - First Commander: Enes Zukanović

By the end of 1994, the East Bosnian Operational Group numbered 7,619 fighters, and at the start of 1995, following additional mobilizatio, its strength rose to 8,097.

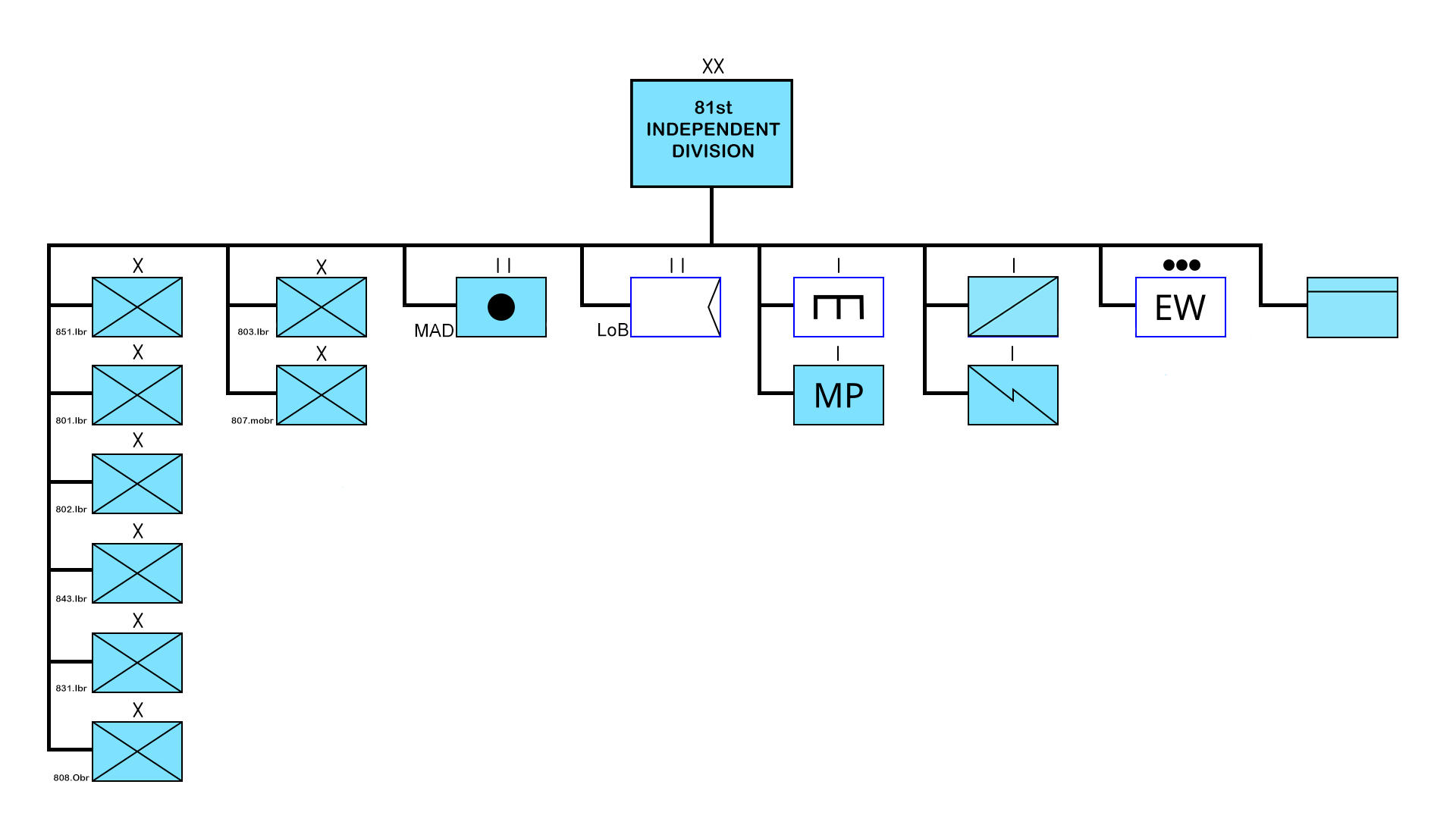
Structure of the 81st Independent Division, June 1995

At the beginning of 1995, the reorganization of the Army of the Republic of Bosnia and Herzegovina continued, and its East Bosnian Operational Group was, by order of General Rasim Delić, Commander of the Army, redesignated as the 81st Independent Division of the Army of the Republic of Bosnia and Herzegovina. In accordance with the decision of the President of the Republic of Bosnia and Herzegovina, Alija Izetbegović, dated 18 January 1995, Hamid Bahto, who had been commanding the East Bosnian Operational Group following the dismissal of Ferid Buljubašić, was formally appointed commander of the 81st Independent Division. The structute of the 81st Independent Division was as follows: Brigades

- 851st Light Brigade
  - Formation Date: 18 Oct 1994
  - Origin: 1st Višegrad Brigade; 1st Rogatica Brigade
    - Commander: Zakir Jamak
- 801st Light Brigade
  - Formation Date: 18 Oct 1994
  - Origin: 1st, 3rd, and 7th Battalions; 1st Drina Brigade
    - Commander: Nihad Klinac
- 802nd Light Brigade
  - Formation Date: 18 Oct 1994
  - Origin: 2nd, 4th, 5th, and 6th Battalions of former 1st Drina Brigade
    - Commander: Edim Fejzić
- 843rd Light Brigade
  - Formation Date: 18 Oct 1994
  - Origin: 43rd Drina Brigade
    - Commander: Salko Osmanspahić
- 831st Light Brigade
  - Formation Date: 18 Oct 1994
  - Origin: 31st Drina Brigade
    - Commander: Mersed Prljača
- 803rd Light Brigade
  - Formation Date: 13 Jun 1995
    - Commander: Bahrudin Kumro
- 807th Muslim Liberation Brigade
  - Formation Date: 17 Jun 1995
    - Commander: Hajrudin Bejtić
- 808th Liberation Brigade
  - Formation Date: Oct 1994
    - Commander: Ahmet Sejdić

Combat Support Units

- 821st Mixed Artillery-Rocket Battalion
  - Commander: Suljo Imamović
- Engineer Company
- Signals Company
- Reconnaissance-Sabotage Company
- Electronic Countermeasures Platoon

Combat Service Support Units

- Logistics Battalion
- Training and Recruitment Center
  - Commander: Ramiz Duraković
- Goražde War Hospital (WH)
  - Commander: Dr. Alija Begović

Garrison Command

- Garrison Command Goražde
  - Commander: Abudelam Sijerčić

== Post-war ==
Following the signings of the Washington Agreement on March 18, 1994, which led to the creation of the Federation of Bosnia and Herzegovina and Dayton Agreement on December 14, 1995, the 81st Independent Division of the Army of the Republic of Bosnia and Herzegovina, along with the Croatian Defence Council, began the process of demobilizing wartime forces. This demobilization marked the beginning of preparations for the transition to peacetime operations and the professionalization of the military. The Defense Law of the Federation of Bosnia and Herzegovina, adopted in late August 1996, provided a framework for the gradual integration of the forces into a unified Army of the Federation of Bosnia and Herzegovina. This integration was successfully completed over the next three years.

== Books ==
- Bahto, Hamid (2008). With the defenders of Sarajevo and Goražde (in Bosnian). Sarajevo: Council of the Congress of Bosniak Intellectuals. ISBN 9958471078.
- Čekić, Smail; Karavelić, Vahid; Ajnadžić, Nedžad; Cikotić, Selmo; Hodžić, Šefko; Smajić, Muhamed; Šadinlija, Mesud (2017). First Corps Army of the Republic of Bosnia and Herzegovina (in Bosnian) (First ed.). Sarajevo: Institute for the Research of Crimes Against Humanity and International Law, University of Sarajevo. ISBN 978-9958-028-25-0..
- Bethlehem, Daniel L.; Weller, Marc (1997). The 'Yugoslav' Crisis in International Law. Cambridge International Documents Series. Vol. 5. Cambridge University Press. p. liv. ISBN 978-0-521-46304-1.
