= 1st Corps (Army of the Republic of Bosnia and Herzegovina) =

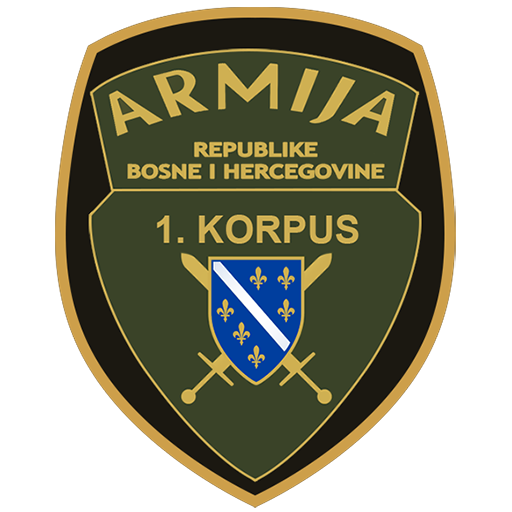
- 1st Corps Patch
- Active: 1 September 1992 – 1995
- Country: Bosnia and Herzegovina
- Allegiance: Army of the Republic of Bosnia and Herzegovina
- Branch: Regular Army
- Type: Motorized, Mountain and Infantry
- Role: Defence of Sarajevo
- Size: 34,500 (1992), 40,500 (1995)
- Garrison/HQ: Sarajevo
- Colors: Green and yellow
- Engagements: Siege of Sarajevo

Commanders
- Notable commanders: Mustafa Hajrulahović Talijan; Vahid Karavelić; Nedžad Ajnadžić

The 1st Corps was one of seven units of the Army of the Republic of Bosnia and Herzegovina established in 1992, in the early part of the Bosnian War.

== History ==
The 1st Corps of the Army of the Republic of Bosnia and Herzegovina was solely established to defend Sarajevo and some part of the Sarajevo region. In 1997–1998, the 1st, 3rd and 7th Corps were incorporated into the 1st Corps of the Army of the Federation of Bosnia and Herzegovina.

== 1st Corps Operational Zone ==
The First Corps was responsible for the zone of Sarajevo during the war with the Bosnian Serb and Croat forces and its headquarters were established in Sarajevo. The First Corps had the assignment of protecting the Sarajevo, Gorazde zone from the opponents.

== Command and Commanders ==
- 1st Commander - Mustafa Hajrulahović Talijan
- 2nd Commander - Vahid Karavelić
- 3rd Commander - Nedžad Ajnadžić
- Deputy Commander: Ismet Dahić
- Deputy Chief of Staff: Ismet Alija (1992–1993)
- Deputy Chief of Staff: Esad Pelko (1993–1995)

== Organization 1992–1994 ==
From 1992 to 1994: These brigades were later renamed in the 3-number series.

- 1st Motorized Brigade
- 1st Mountain Brigade
- 2nd Motorized Brigade
- 2nd Mountain Brigade
- 3rd Motorized Brigade
- 5th Infantry Brigade
- 9th Mountain Brigade
  - Commander: Nezir Kazić
- 9th Motorized Brigade
  - Deputy Commander: Ramiz Delalić "Ćelo"
- 10th Mountain Brigade
  - 1st Commander: Mušan Topalović
- 11th Infantry Brigade
- 12th Infantry Brigade
- 15th Motorized Brigade
- 105th Motorized Brigade
- HVO Brigade "Kralj Tvrtko"
- Artillery Brigade

== Organization 1995 ==
In January 1995, all Corps operational groups were transformed into divisions and each division contained numerous brigades, further divided into battalions, detachments and specialized units.

- 12th Division (Sarajevo)
  - 101st Mountain Brigade, HQ Sarajevo-Mojmilo
  - 102nd Motorized Brigade, HQ Sarajevo-Stup
  - 105th motorized Brigade, HQ Sarajevo-Kosevo
  - 111th Vitezka Motorized Brigade, HQ Sarajevo-Zuc Hill
  - 112th Vitezka Motorized Brigade, HQ Sarajevo-Rajlovac
  - 115th Mountain Brigade, HQ Sarajevo-Bistrik
  - 124th Light Brigade "King Tvrtko", HQ Sarajevo
  - 152nd Mountain Brigade, HQ Vasin Han
  - 155th Motorized Brigade, HQ Sarajevo-Dobrinja
- 14th Division
  - 104th Vitezka Brigade, HQ Hrasnica
  - 109th Mountain Brigade, HQ Pazaric
  - 123rd Light Brigade, Bilalovac
  - 131st Light Brigade, HQ Fojnica
  - 181st Mountain Brigade, HQ Pazaric
  - 182nd Vitezka Light Brigade, HQ Pazaric
- 16th Division
  - 147th Light Brigade, HQ Vares
  - 161st Slavna Olovo Mountain Brigade, HQ Olovo
  - 162nd Mountain Brigade, HQ Vares
  - 164th Mountain Brigade, HQ Breza
  - 165th Mountain Brigade, HQ Visoko
  - 185th Light Brigade, HQ Vares

== Military Operations and Engagements ==
- Siege of Sarajevo
- Operation Neretva '93

== See also ==
- 2nd Corps
- 3rd Corps
- 4th Corps
- 5th Corps
- 6th Corps
- 7th Corps
