= Archives of Bosnia and Herzegovina =

National archive in Sarajevo

Coordinates: 43.858080089454°N 18.413651720184458°E

- Arhiv Bosne i Hercegovine
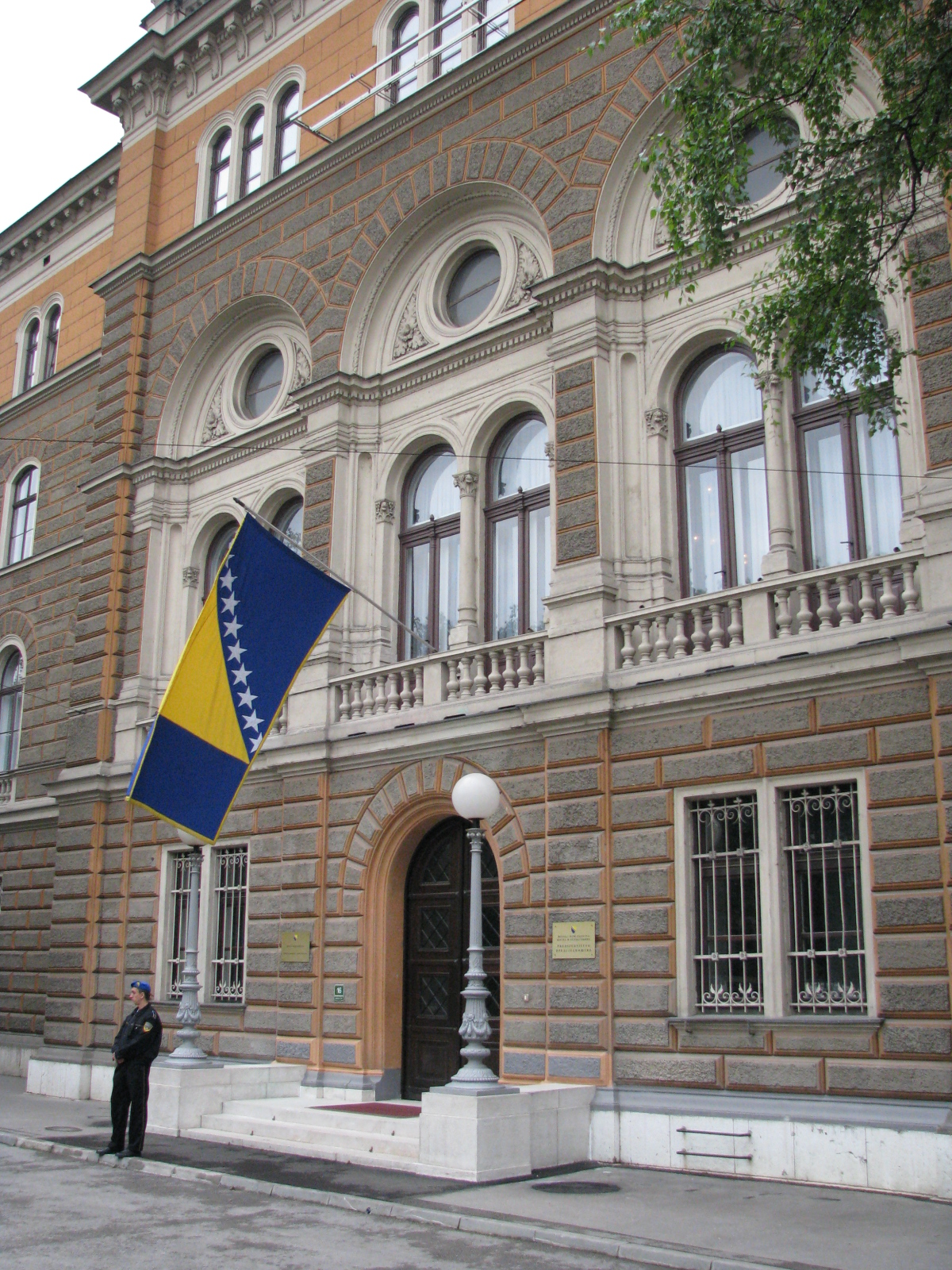
- Building housing the Archives of Bosnia and Herzegovina

National archives overview
- Formed: June 1, 1997
- Jurisdiction: Bosnia and Herzegovina
- Headquarters: Sarajevo
- National archives executive: Director
- Website: www.arhivbih.gov.ba

Archives of Bosnia and Herzegovina is the national archives of Bosnia and Herzegovina, located in Sarajevo. It was founded in 1947.

== 2014 unrests ==
During the 2014 unrest in Bosnia and Herzegovina large amounts of historical documents were destroyed when sections of the Archives of Bosnia and Herzegovina, housed in the presidential building, were set on fire. Among the lost archival material were documents and gifts from the late Ottoman period, original documents from the 1878–1918 Austro-Hungarian rule in Bosnia and Herzegovina, as well as documentations of the interwar period, the 1941–1945 rule of the Independent State of Croatia, papers from the following years, and about 15,000 files from the 1996–2003 Human Rights Chamber for Bosnia and Herzegovina. In the repositories that were burnt, about 60 percent of the material was lost, according to estimates by Šaban Zahirović, the head of the Archives.

Of the seven Bosnian rioters suspected of having started the fire, two (Salem Hatibović and Nihad Trnka) were arrested.

On 4 April 2014, Hatibović and Trnka were released (although still under suspicion of terrorism), on the condition that they do not change their places of residence and abstain from having any contact with each other. Both were also mandated to report to the police once every week.

== See also ==
- Archives of the Federation of Bosnia and Herzegovina
- Archives of Republika Srpska
- List of national archives
