= Jovan Divjak =

Bosnian general (1937–2021)

- Јован Дивјак
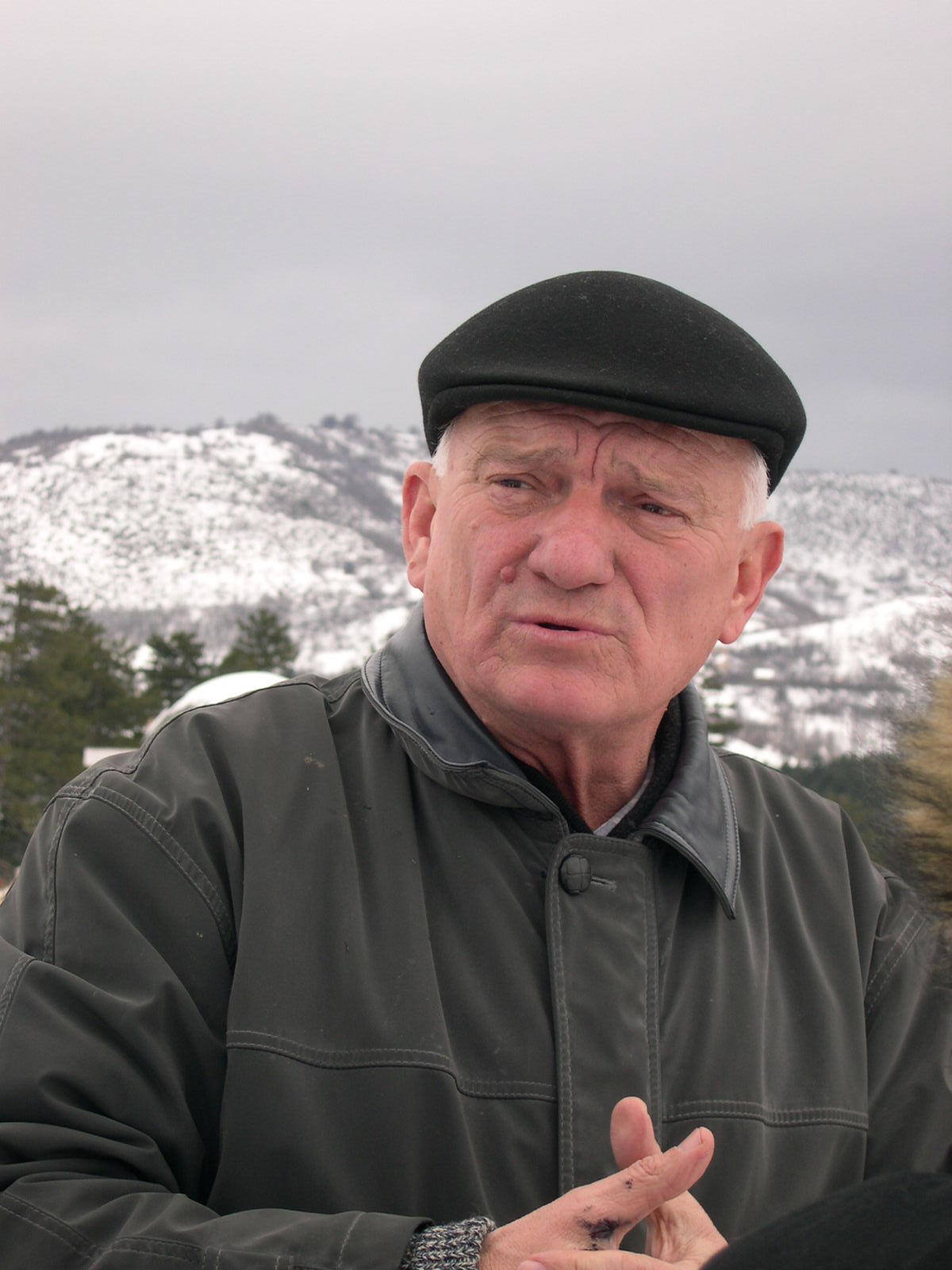
- Divjak in 2006
- Born: 11 March 1937; Belgrade, Kingdom of Yugoslavia (modern-day Serbia)
- Died: 8 April 2021 (aged 84); Sarajevo, Bosnia and Herzegovina
- Resting place: Bare Cemetery, Sarajevo
- Other name: Čika Jovo (English: Uncle Jovo)
- Spouse: Vera Divjak (m. 1960; died 2017)
- Children: 2
- Military career
- Allegiance: Yugoslavia; Bosnia and Herzegovina
- Branch: Yugoslav Ground Forces; Army of the Republic of Bosnia and Herzegovina
- Service years: 1956–1997
- Rank: General
- Conflicts: Bosnian War: Siege of Sarajevo

Jovan Divjak (Serbian Cyrillic: Јован Дивјак; 11 March 1937 – 8 April 2021) was a Bosnian general who served as the Deputy Commander of the Bosnian army's general staff until 1994, during the Bosnian War.

== Early life and education ==
Divjak was born in Belgrade to parents originally from the Bosanska Krajina region of Bosnia. His father, a teacher by profession, was serving in the Royal Yugoslav Army in a village outside of Belgrade at the time of Divjak's birth. Jovan's family, like himself when he was alive, live in Sarajevo, to which Divjak moved in 1966. From 1956 to 1959, he attended the Military Academy in Belgrade. In 1964 and 1965, he attended the École d'État Major in Paris. Although Divjak was an ethnic Serb born in Serbia, he identified as a Bosnian.

== Career ==
From 1969 to 1971, Divjak was in the Cadet Academy in Belgrade, and from 1979 to 1981, he served in the War and Defense Planning School there. After several posts in the JNA, he was appointed Territorial Defense Chief in command of the Mostar sector from 1984 to 1989 and the Sarajevo sector from 1989 to 1991.

Between 1991 and 1993, Divjak was court-martialed by the JNA for issuing 120 pieces of light armor and 20,000 bullets to the Kiseljak Territorial Defence and was sentenced to nine months' imprisonment. He avoided the sentence by leaving the JNA and joining the Territorial Defense of the Republic of Bosnia and Herzegovina. In the first days of war, he was arrested under the charge of collaborating with the Serb forces and was imprisoned for 27 days. In prison, Divjak was on a hunger strike for four days.

Divjak later became the Deputy Commander of the Territorial Defense forces of Bosnia and Herzegovina and a month later he oversaw the defence of Sarajevo from a major JNA attack. Between 1993 and 1997, Divjak served as the Deputy Commander of the Headquarters of the Army of Bosnia and Herzegovina, charged with co-operating with civilian institutions and organisations (administration, economy, health, and education).

Divjak, as an ethnic Serb, was made a general in order to present a multiethnic character of the Army of the Republic of Bosnia and Herzegovina. He himself commented on the issue by saying that he felt like a "flower arrangement" and said that "of course, someone has to be a flower arrangement too". He expressed that it was shameful if his service to the army were only temporary. Indeed, he and Stjepan Šiber (as a Croat) were the only non-Bosniaks in the general staff. Both of them were offered retirement in March 1996 by the Chairman of the Presidency of Bosnia and Herzegovina, Alija Izetbegović. At the beginning of the war, out of 18 percent of Croats and 12 percent of Serbs, only one percent of both remained in the ranks of the Bosnian army. Divjak complained about that to Rasim Delić, then a Chief of Staff, as well as Izetbegović, but it was explained that it was because "Bosniak soldiers didn't trust the Serb commanders." Divjak was later excluded by Delić from the decision-making process in the Army. The Bosniaks in the Army allegedly had no confidence in Serb commanders according to Oslobođenje.

== Later life ==
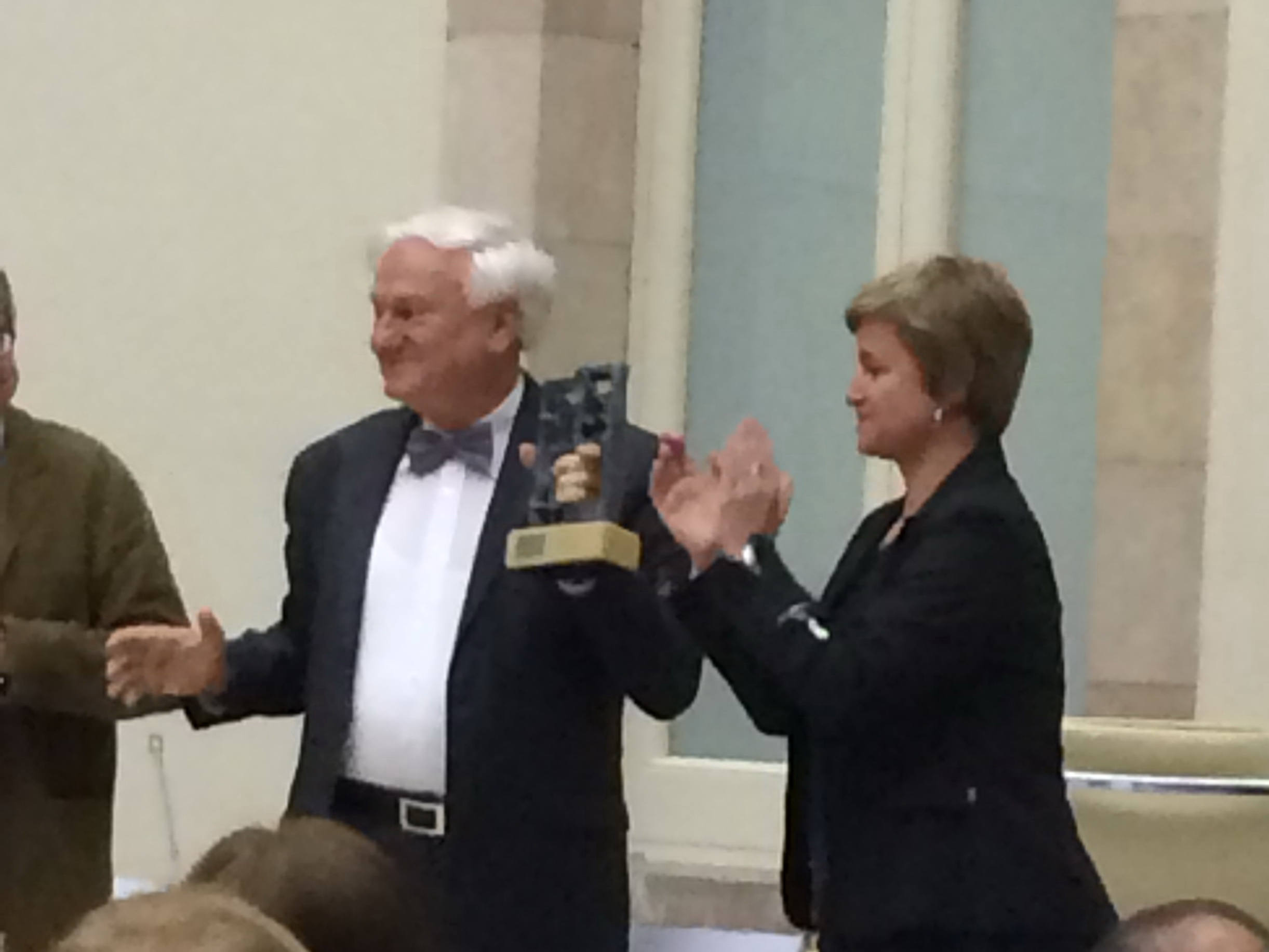
Divjak receiving the "Peace Builders" Award in the Parliament of Catalonia from Anna Simó in Barcelona, 17 March 2014.

Divjak was the executive director of OGBH ("Obrazovanje Gradi BiH": "Education builds Bosnia and Herzegovina"), which he co-founded. The association's goals were to help children whose families were victims of the war.

Divjak won many international and national awards, including the French Legion of Honour, Order of Lafayette, Sixth of April Award of Sarajevo, the International League of Humanists Plaque, and the Plaque of the Sarajevo Canton.

From 1998 until his death, Divjak was a member of the Association of Independent Intellectuals "Krug 99", Sarajevo. Before 1998, he was an active member of other associations, including sports associations, and the faculty of physical education in Sarajevo, and he has been a member of various NGOs in Bosnia.

Divjak enjoyed popularity among the general public of Sarajevo, and has been dubbed Jovo Divjak, General Jovo and Uncle Jovo. He was the author of two books:

- In French "Sarajevo, mon amour". Entretiens avec Florence La Bruyere; published by Buchet-Chastel in 2004 with a foreword by Bernard-Henri Lévy.
- In Bosnian, "Ratovi u Hrvatskoj i Bosni i Hercegovini 1991–1995", "Dani" and Jesenski and Tura in 1999.

He appeared in the BBC documentary The Death of Yugoslavia in 1995 and is the subject of a 2013 Al-Jazeera World documentary, Sarajevo My Love.

In 2006, he was awarded the title of Universal Peace Ambassador by the Worldwide Council of the Universal Ambassador Peace Circle in Geneva.

On 3 March 2011, Divjak was arrested in Vienna in response to a Serbian arrest warrant accusing him of war crimes relating to an attack on a Yugoslav army column in Sarajevo early in the 1992–95 war. However, Austria did not extradite him to Belgrade. On 8 March 2011, he was bailed from custody in Vienna and on 29 July 2011, he was released after Serbia's extradition request was denied by an Austrian court due to lack of evidence and the inability to guarantee a fair trial in Serbia.

== Personal life ==
Divjak was married to his wife Vera from 1960 until her death in 2017. They had two sons, one of whom served in the Bosnian army. He also had a Bosniak godson whose brothers were killed in the Bosnian War.

=== Death ===
On 8 April 2021, Divjak died in Sarajevo at the age of 84. He was buried in Sarajevo at the Bare Cemetery on 13 April, five days after his death.

==== Reactions and tributes ====
Following Divjak's death, many prominent Bosnian politicians and public figures reacted to his death, including Bosnian Presidency members Željko Komšić and Šefik Džaferović, former presidency member Bakir Izetbegović, newly elected Mayor of Sarajevo Benjamina Karić, poet and screenwriter Abdulah Sidran, former footballers Emir Spahić and Faruk Hadžibegić and many others.

Foreign media also reacted to Divjak's death, with the likes of Voice of America, El País, France 24, Swissinfo and others remembering his life.

The day after Divjak's death, on 9 April, the people of Mostar paid tribute to Divjak. The same day, an image of Divjak was projected onto the Vijećnica (Sarajevo City Hall), thus Sarajevo symbolically paid tribute to him. Upon his death, the government of Sarajevo Canton announced that 13 April 2021, the day of his burial, would be a national day of mourning throughout the canton.

== Books ==
- Thomas, Nigel (2006). The Yugoslav Wars (2): Bosnia, Kosovo and Macedonia 1992–2001. Osprey Publishing Ltd. ISBN 978-1-4728-0196-8.
