= Gornja Bočinja =

Village in Maglaj, Bosnia and Herzegovina

Gornja Bočinja Горња Бочиња
- Village
- Location within Bosnia and Herzegovina
- Coordinates: 44.5242°N 18.2111°E
- Country: Bosnia and Herzegovina
- Entity: Federation of Bosnia and Herzegovina
- Canton: Zenica-Doboj
- Municipality: Maglaj

Area
  - Total: 6.09 sq mi (15.78 km^{2})

Population (2013)
  - Total: 22
  - Density: 3.6/sq mi (1.4/km^{2})
- Time zone: UTC+1 (CET)
  - Summer (DST): UTC+2 (CEST)

Gornja Bočinja (Serbian Cyrillic: Горња Бочиња) is a village in the municipality of Maglaj, Bosnia and Herzegovina.

== Demographics ==
According to the 2013 census, its population was 22.

Ethnicity in 2013
Ethnicity	Number	Percentage
Serbs	18	81.8%
Bosniaks	4	18.2%
Total	22	100%
