= 6th Corps (Army of the Republic of Bosnia and Herzegovina) =

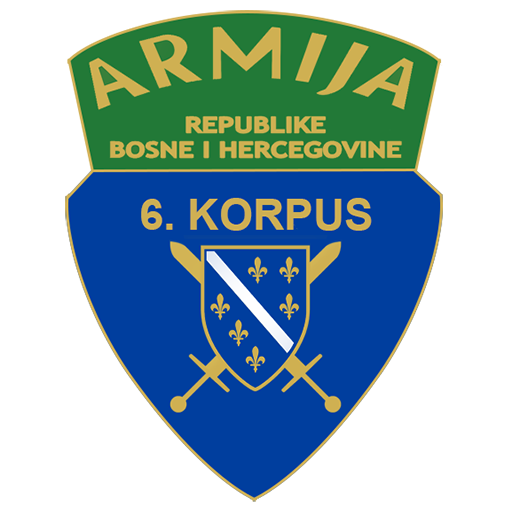
- 6th Corps Patch
- Active: 9 June 1993 – 26 February 1994
- Country: Bosnia and Herzegovina
- Allegiance: Army of the Republic of Bosnia and Herzegovina
- Branch: Regular Army
- Type: Motorized, Mountain and Infantry
- Role: Defence of Konjic
- Size: 34,500
- Garrison/HQ: Konjic
- Colors: Green and yellow
- Engagements: Capturing of Vlašić mountain

Commanders
- Notable commanders: Salko Gušić; Galib Hodžić

The 6th Corps was a corps of the Army of the Republic of Bosnia and Herzegovina.

== History ==
The 6th Corps of the Army of the Republic of Bosnia and Herzegovina was formed on 9 June 1993. Konjic became the headquarters of the 6th Corps. 6th Corps was formed from 4th Corps Northern Herzegovina Operational Group to occupy northern Herzegovina from the Croatian Defence Council, known as HVO, and eventually reach the Adriatic coast. It was disbanded in 1994.

Some units were incorporated into the 1st Corps and the rest into the 4th Corps of the Army of the Federation of Bosnia and Herzegovina, which was created after the signing of the 1995 Dayton Agreement.

== Commanders ==
- 1st Commander: Salko Gušić

== 6th Corps Units ==
- 43rd Mountain Brigade (Konjic)
- 44th Mountain Brigade 'Neretvica' (Jablanica)
  - 1st Commander: Enes Kovačević
  - 2nd Commander: Hasan Hakalović
- 45th Mountain Brigade 'Neretvica' (Jablanica)
- 49th Mountain Brigade
- 304th Brigade
- 445th Light Infantry Brigade (Konjic)
- 450th Light Infantry Brigade (Bjelimići)
- Neretva Brigade
  - Commander: Enes Kovačević
- Operational Group East - Visoko
- Vareš Brigade
- Nemilu Brigade
- Reconnaissance and Sabotage brigade
  - Commander: Ibrahim Purić
