= Moševac =

Village in Maglaj, Bosnia and Herzegovina

- Village
- Location within Bosnia and Herzegovina
- Country: Bosnia and Herzegovina
- Entity: Federation of Bosnia and Herzegovina
- Canton: Zenica-Doboj
- Municipality: Maglaj

Area
  - Total: 2.73 sq mi (7.08 km^{2})

Population (2013)
  - Total: 1,490
  - Density: 545/sq mi (210/km^{2})
- Time zone: UTC+1 (CET)
  - Summer (DST): UTC+2 (CEST)

Moševac is a village that is located in the municipality of Maglaj, in Bosnia and Herzegovina.

== Demographics ==
According to the 2013 census, its population was 1,490.

Ethnicity in 2013
Ethnicity	Number	Percentage
Bosniaks	1,468	98.5%
Croats	1	0.1%
other/undeclared	21	1.4%
Total	1,490	100%
