= Army of the Republic of Bosnia and Herzegovina =

Land branch of the Bosnian and Herzegovinan Armed Forces

- Armija Republike Bosne i Hercegovine (Bosnian); Армија Републике Босне и Херцеговине (Cyrillic)
- Founded: 15 April 1992
- Disbanded: 14 December 1997
- Service branches: Army; Air Force and Air Defense
- Headquarters: Sarajevo, Republic of Bosnia and Herzegovina

Leadership
- Commander-in-Chief: Alija Izetbegović (last)
- Minister of Defence: Munib Bisić (last)
- Chief of the General Staff: Sefer Halilović (first); Rasim Delić (last)

Personnel
- Conscription: Yes
- Active personnel: 120,000–230,000 (1995)

Related articles
- History: Bosnian military history
- Ranks: Bosnian military ranks

The Army of the Republic of Bosnia and Herzegovina (Bosnian: Armija Republike Bosne i Hercegovine; Cyrillic: Армија Републике Босне и Херцеговине; ARBiH), often referred to as Bosnian Army, was the military force of the Republic of Bosnia and Herzegovina. It was established by the government of the Republic of Bosnia and Herzegovina in 1992 following the outbreak of the Bosnian War.

Following the end of the war, and the signing of the Dayton Peace Agreement in 1995, it was after transformed into the Army of the Federation of Bosnia and Herzegovina. The ARBiH was the only military force on the territory of Bosnia and Herzegovina recognised as legal by other governments. Under the State Defense Reform Law the Armed Forces of Bosnia and Herzegovina were unified into a single structure, the Armed Forces of Bosnia and Herzegovina (OSBiH), making entity armies defunct.

== History ==
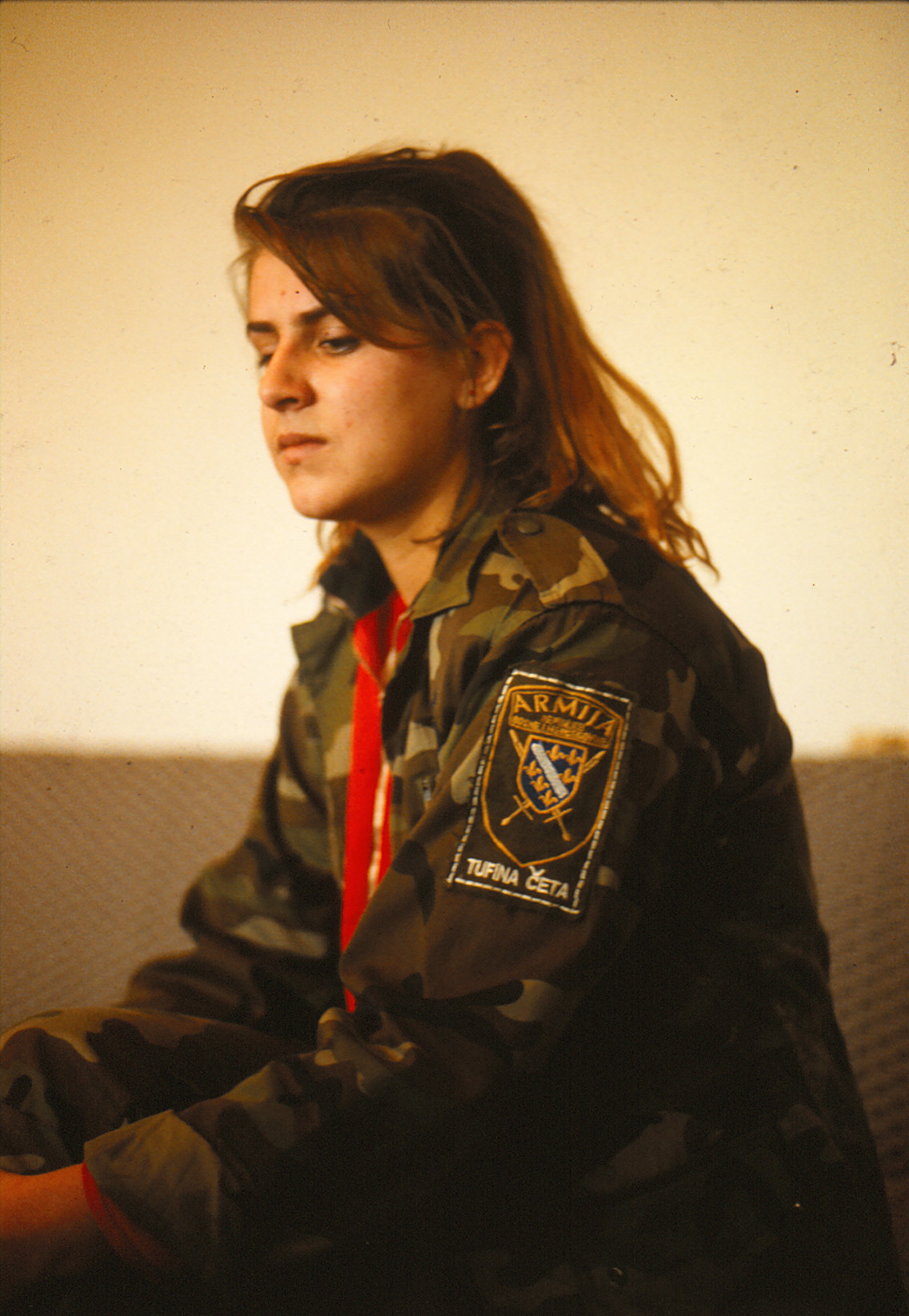
ARBiH female conscript in Visoko in 1992

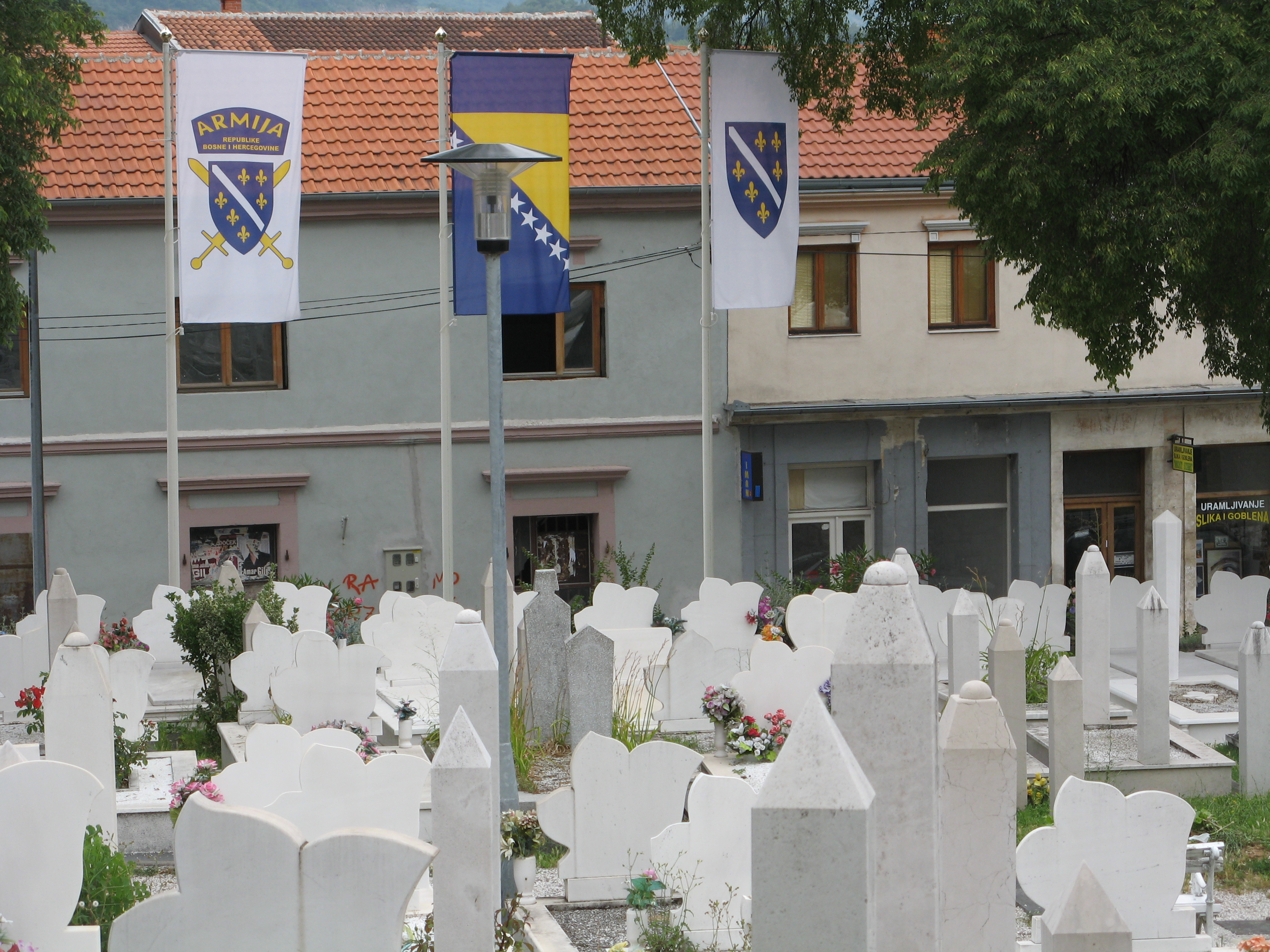
A cemetery in Mostar flying the flag of Army of the Republic of Bosnia and Herzegovina (left), the flag of Bosnia and Herzegovina, and the flag of the Republic of Bosnia and Herzegovina

=== Creation and composition ===
From July 1991 to January 1992, during the Croatian War of Independence, the Yugoslav People's Army (JNA) and Serb paramilitaries used Bosnian territory to wage attacks on Croatia. The Army of Republic of Bosnia and Herzegovina was formed on 15 April 1992 during the early days of the Bosnian War. Before the ARBiH was officially created, a number of paramilitary and civil defense groups were established. The Patriotic League (PL) and the local Territorial Defence Force of the Republic of Bosnia and Herzegovina (TORBiH) were the official army while paramilitaries such as the Zelene Beretke (Green Berets) and Crni Labudovi (Black Swans) units were also active. Other irregular groups included Bosnian mafia groups, as well as collections of police and former JNA soldiers. The army was formed in poor circumstances and suffered from a very limited supply of arms. Critical deficiencies included tanks and other heavy weaponry. Alija Izetbegović agreed to disarm the existing Territorial Defense forces on the demand of the JNA. This was defied by Bosnian Croats and Muslim organizations that gained control of many facilities and weapons of the TORBiH. The first commander of the ARBiH was Sefer Halilović.

=== 1992 ===
In 1992, the ARBiH was losing most of the battles and consequently, 70% of Bosnia and Herzegovina was under Yugoslav People's Army (JNA), and later Bosnian Serb army (VRS) control, with Sarajevo, the capital of Bosnia and Herzegovina, besieged. The ARBiH had defended Sarajevo with light weaponry, most of them captured from hostile forces or bought off the black market. The army was surrounded and the transfer of supplies was hard, if not impossible. However, ARBiH forces within the Bosanska Krajina (Bihać pocket) region were steadily defending the territory despite being surrounded by hostile forces. Mujahideen arrived in central Bosnia in the latter half of 1992 with the aim of helping their Bosnian Muslim co-religionists in fights against Serb and Croat forces. Initially they mainly came from Arab countries, later from other Muslim-majority countries.

=== 1993 ===
1993 saw no major changes in the front lines against Serbs. Instead, this year marked the start of the Croat–Bosniak War in Central Bosnia and in Herzegovina, notably the Mostar region. In the broader Mostar area the Serbs provided military support for the Muslim side and hired out tanks and heavy artillery to the ARBiH. The VRS artillery shelled HVO positions on the hills overlooking Mostar. Pressured by heavily armed Serb forces, the Croatian Defence Council (HVO) shifted its focus from defending against the VRS to securing territories envisioned as part of a "common Croatian state." Because these territories were under the control of the Bosnian government, the HVO, acting as a subordinate command of the Croatian Army, initiated offensives against ARBiH-held areas to consolidate its control. The HVO with great engagement from the military of the Republic of Croatia and material support from Serbs, attacked Bosniak civilian population in Herzegovina and in central Bosnia, starting ethnic cleansing of Bosniak-populated territories, such as the Lašva Valley ethnic cleansing.

In early September ARBiH launched an operation known as Operation Neretva '93 against the HVO. The ARBiH made limited gains in the area of northern Herzegovina and around Mostar, but did not achieve a breakthrough to the southern Neretva, where the HVO retained control. Vastly under-equipped Bosnian forces, fighting on two fronts, were able to repel Croats and gain territory against them on every front. At this time, due to its geographic position, Bosnia was surrounded by Croat and Serb forces from all sides. There was no way to import weapons or food. What saved Bosnia at this time was its vast industrial complex (steel and other heavy industry), which was able to switch to military production. After a short but bloody war, and once Croats realized that their partnership with Serbs would not bring them any territorial gains, they agreed to the U.S. leadership's "Washington Treaty" peace agreement. From that point on, Croat and Bosnian government forces fought as allies against Serbs.

The Intra-Bosnian Muslim War was a civil war fought between the ARBiH loyal to central government of Alija Izetbegović in Sarajevo and the Autonomous Province of Western Bosnia loyal to Fikret Abdić in Velika Kladuša from 1993 in the region of the western Bosnia.

On 13 August 1993, the Bosnian government officially organized foreign volunteers into the detachment known as El Mudžahid in order to impose control and order. The foreign mujahideen sometimes recruited local young men into the foreign mujahideen units. The mujahideen also participated in battles against the HVO alongside ARBiH units.

=== 1994 ===
The Washington Agreement was signed in March 1994, reintegrating Bosniak and Croat alliance. The objective was to form a strong force that could fight the much stronger and better equipped VRS. This was the time of frequent peace negotiations. Split Agreement was signed in Split, Croatia on 22 July 1995. It called on the Croatian Army (HV) to intervene militarily in Bosnia and Herzegovina, primarily in relieving the siege of Bihać.

=== 1995 ===
Despite the loss of several enclaves, notably Srebrenica, 1995 was marked by HVO and ARBiH offensives and later by NATO intervention. Following the Split Agreement, the Croatian Army, with cooperation from the ARBiH and the HVO, launched a series of operations: Flash, Summer '95, Storm and Mistral 2. In conjunction, Bosnian forces launched operations like Sana. Bosnian and Croat armies were on the offensive in this phase.

From August to December 1995, Serb forces were defeated and driven out of the majority of Croatia and western Bosnia, and the ethnic Serb population fled from these parts.

Following the second Markale massacre, a NATO intervention was launched, which destroyed much of the VRS' infrastructure in just a few days through Operation Deliberate Force. The war ended with the signing of the Dayton Accord.

== Commanders ==
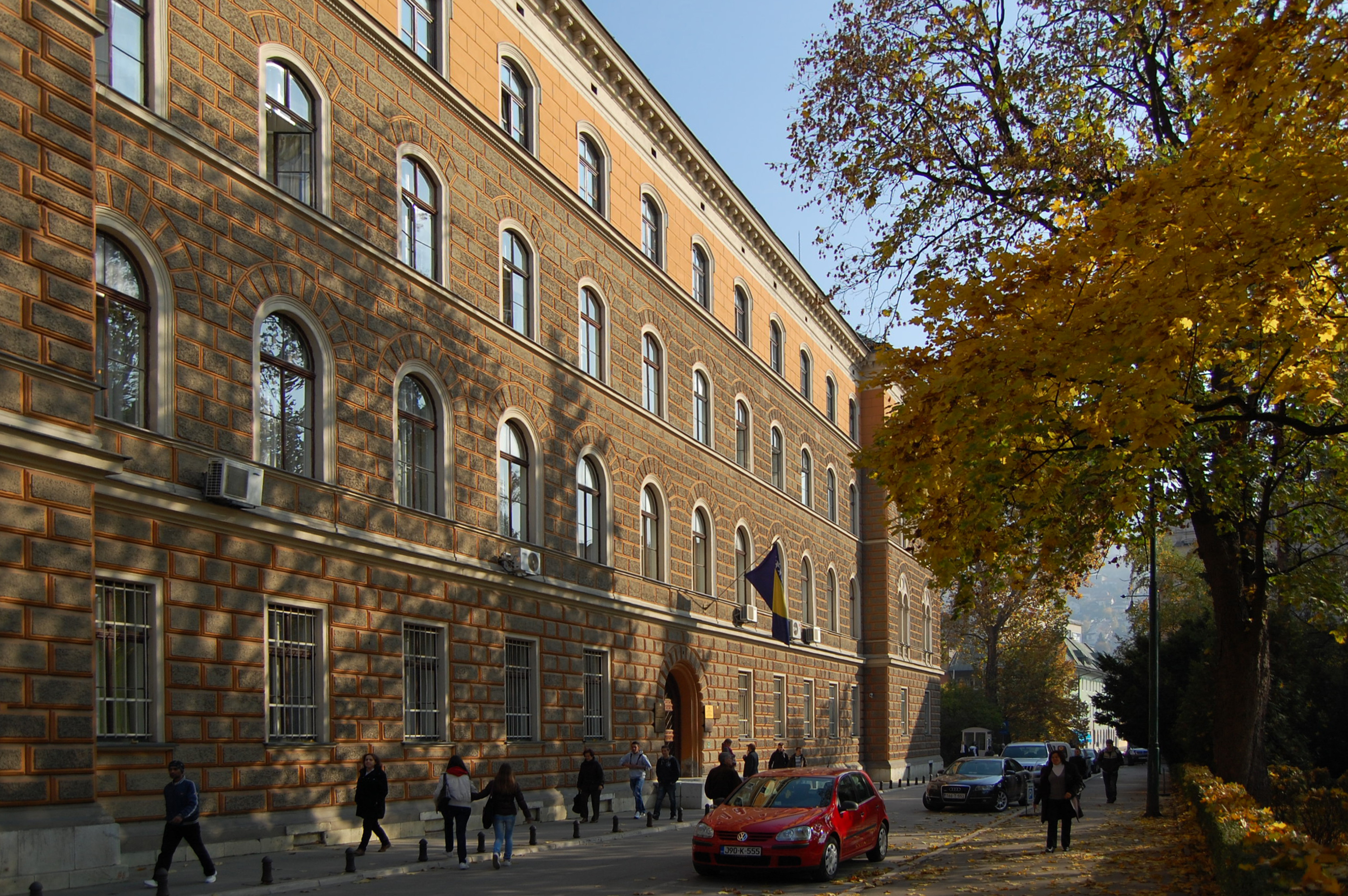
Supreme Command of the Army of the Republic of Bosnia and Herzegovina in central Sarajevo

- Alija Izetbegović (the Supreme Commander of the Bosnian Armed Forces)
- Hasan Efendić (first commander of the Territorial Defence Force of the Republic of Bosnia and Herzegovina)
- Sefer Halilović (Chief of Staff of the Main Staff and Commander of the Bosnian Army, 1992–1993)
- Rasim Delić (Commander of Main Staff and Commander of the Bosnian Army, 1993–1995)
- Jovan Divjak (deputy of the ARBiH commander, 1992–1995)
- Stjepan Šiber (deputy of the ARBiH commander, 1992–1995)

== Organization ==
=== Pre-Centralization ===
The Political leadership in Sarajevo had met in Mehurići to decide alternatives if Slovenia and Croatia should follow their stated plans to declare independence. After this board meeting Hasan Čengić met with Rusmir Mahmutćehajić to propose the formation of a paramilitary that would be an adjunct of SDA. Once approved by Alija Izetbegović the first defense organization known as the "Patriotic League" was formed. Another paramilitary known as the "Green Berets" would be formed from the people to help places where there where no defense organized by the local authority. As Bosnia declared independence the "Territorial Defense" was established as the state's official army and the Patriotic League integrated a month later. The existence of other armed groups would lead the government to request the unification of all armed entities into one formation creating one official armed forces. This reform request would not last long as all other entities except the separatist ones would join finally establishing a centralized army. The newly reformed army would still be known as the "Territorial Defense" until July where the Army of the Republic of Bosnia and Herzegovina was officially established.

=== Paramilitaries and Defense Forces ===
Patriotic League B&H	The Patriotic League was the first organized paramilitary created to defend the nation in case of aggression by anti-Bosnian militants.
Territorial Defense B&H	The Territorial Defense Force of the Republic of Bosnia and Herzegovina (Teritorijalna odbrana Bosne i Hercegovine (TO BiH) was the first official armed forces of Bosnia and Herzegovina at the beginning of the Bosnian War. Which eventually transformed into the Army of the Republic of Bosnia and Herzegovina.
GB "Bosnae"	The Green Berets "Bosnae" were a paramilitary organization founded in Sarajevo. They were eventually integrated into the newly founded Army of the Republic of Bosnia and Herzegovina.
Croatian Defence Forces	The Croatian Defense Forces was a paramilitary formed in Croatia by the Croatian Party of Rights serving as its military wing. The paramilitary, however, was formed prior to Croatia’s armed conflict with Serb paramilitaries in Croatia. Units established in Bosnia would fight alongside both Bosnian & Croat forces. The commander of the paramilitary in Bosnia accepted subordination with the Bosnian Army general staff. This choice would get him assassinated by the anti-Bosnian faction in the Croatian defense council. With the superior dead this armed force slowly faded away and few units would be absorbed and reorganized into the Bosnian army.
Crotian Defence Council "Sarajevo"	The Croatian Defense Council Sarajevo was established as a political and military representative of the Croatian people in Sarajevo. The Sarajevo organization was linked with the rest of the Croatian Defence Council. When Bosnian Croat separatists fought against Bosnian government forces this formation did not engage. Eventually, it was abolished and reformed into the Croatian Brigade "King Tvrtko" within the 1st Corps of the Bosnian army.

=== Post-Centralization ===
The new army was divided into corps, each stationed in a particular territory. In 1993, most brigades were renamed as Mountain troops given that the lack of heavy weapons made it organizationally pointless to list them as infantry or motorized. In addition, Bosnian terrain favored light infantry over armored and mechanized formations. The special forces alongside the military police were controlled directly by the general staff of the army, which was initially based in Sarajevo before moving to Kakanj in 1994, while maintaining key installations such as the main logistics center in Visoko and the military school center in Zenica. This centralized command did not prevent corps and individual brigades from forming their own smaller special operations units and military police battalions independently.

=== Army Corps and Independent Divisions ===
1st Corps	This corps was the first to be formed in 1992 and served in the protection of Sarajevo in the Siege.
2nd Corps	This corps was formed in 1992 and had major success in holding Tuzla area and in operations like "Operation Vozuća". This was also the only corps which had direct connection at one time during the war with the Independent 81 Division. The corps was active within the Tuzla region.
3rd Corps	The corps was formed in 1992 and because of quick change in fighting, towns like Vareš were liberated. The corps was active within some of Central Bosnia.
4th Corps	The corps was famous for the successful defense of the city of Mostar. The corps was formed in 1992 and cooperated also with the Croatian Defence Forces. Despite this, the corps was active and responsible for operations within the Mostar region of Central Bosnia during the Croat-Bosniak War.
5th Corps	The 5th corps formed in 1992 was one of the most organised and highly-decorated corps within the army. The corps was active within Western Bosnia (in the Bosanska Krajina region near Bihać) and was responsible for liberating much of the territory controlled by the Republic of Bosnia and Herzegovina in operations like: Operation Mistral 2, Operation Storm and Operation Sana.
6th Corps	Formed 9 June 1993. Disbanded February 1994, some units incorporated in 7th Corps and the rest in 4th Corps.
7th Corps	The corps was one of the most important as it liberated many territories within Central Bosnia. The corps was notable for their success of capturing Mount Vlašić, which was a strategic point for all 3 warring parties.
81st Division	This was not classified as a corps rather as an independent division because the division was not connected to any corps within the region. This division was responsible for military operations around the Goražde enclave.
28th Division	This was not classified as a corps, rather as an independent division because the division was not connected to any corps within the region. This division was responsible for military operations around the Srebrenica enclave.

=== General Staff Units ===
Crni Labudovi	The 120. Light Brigade "Crni Labudovi" was a unit responsible for high-risk operations, mostly high-value target operations such as the elimination of artillery/bunker/marksman positions. The unit has a long history as it existed before the formal army in the patriotic league and then the territorial defense as a specialized unit.
Guards Brigade "Delta"	The Guards Brigade "Delta" was an elite unit that existed in the Bosnian army until it got dissolved a year later because it was estimated that its commanding staff was loyal to the army general. The Bosnian counterintelligence had been infiltrated by people who were serving the enemy side with information. With high positions they convinced the president that the unit was going to perform a coup against the government.
Guards Brigade	The Guards Brigade was formed as a rapid deployment force late in the war. It would be filled by soldiers from the military police battalion formerly part of the general staff primarily from Sarajevo and shortly elsewhere. In addition to combat tasks, the brigade also provided security for the general staff and had an honorary squad for welcoming ceremonies in honor of delegations and guests of the Bosnian presidency. After the war and the creation of the federal army, in 1998 this unit would transition into an elite "Ranger" battalion.

=== Mobilized Police Forces ===
Ministry of Internal Affairs	The Ministry of Internal Affairs was the governing body of the police forces in the state from 1992 to 1995.
Police Detachment "Bosna"	Based in Sarajevo, the Police Detachment for Special Purposes "Bosna" was the first special police force to emerge from the former republic's structures. Made iconic by Dino Merlin and his song "Vojnik Srece," which he dedicated to the unit, it modeled its training and equipment on the German federal special police force GSG-9.
Police Detachment "Lasta"	Based in Sarajevo, the Police Detachment for Special Purposes "Lasta" was the second special police force created by a decision of the ministry of internal affairs. While its counterpart primarily focused on operations within Sarajevo, this squad was deployed for combat across all government-controlled areas.
Police Detachment "Manevar"	Headquartered in Zenica, the Police Detachment "Manevar" engaged in the country's most complex operations while simultaneously performing standard police duties to ensure peace and security for citizens.

== Equipment ==
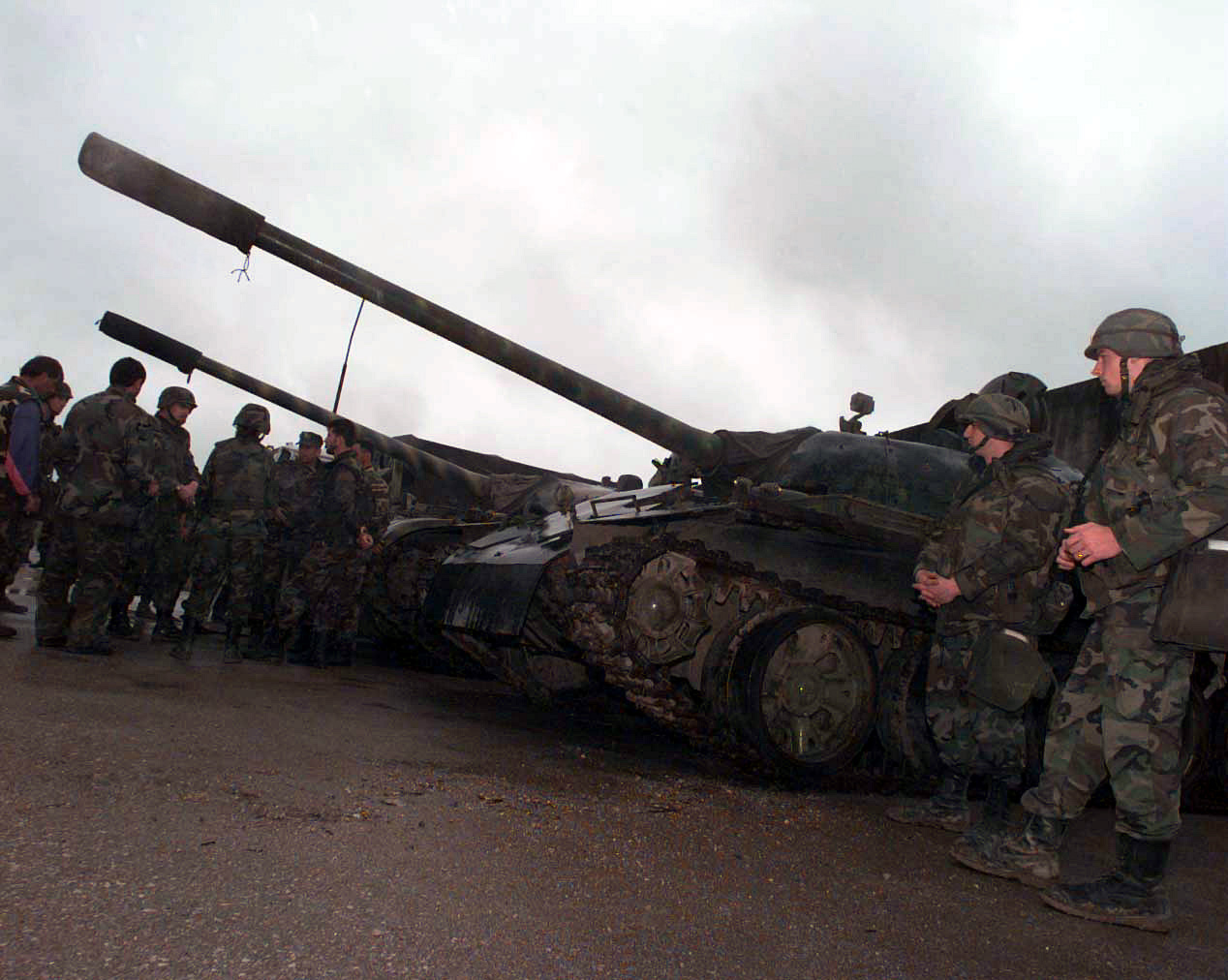
T-55 tanks belonging to the 28th Division, 281st Brigade, 1st Tank Battalion, stationed in Visca.

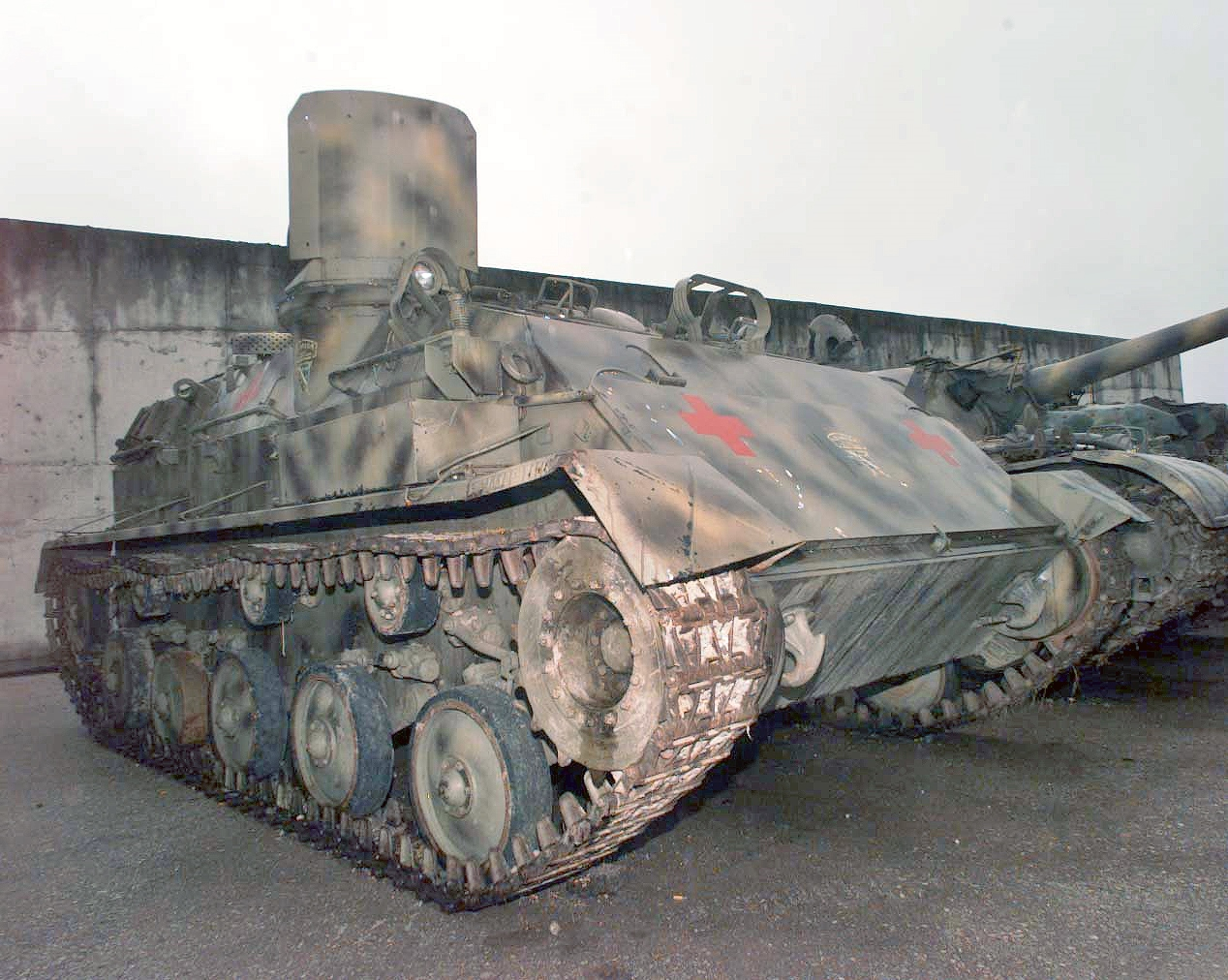
OT M-60 Armored Personnel Carrier belonging to the 28th Division, 281st Brigade, 1st Tank Battalion, stationed in Visca.

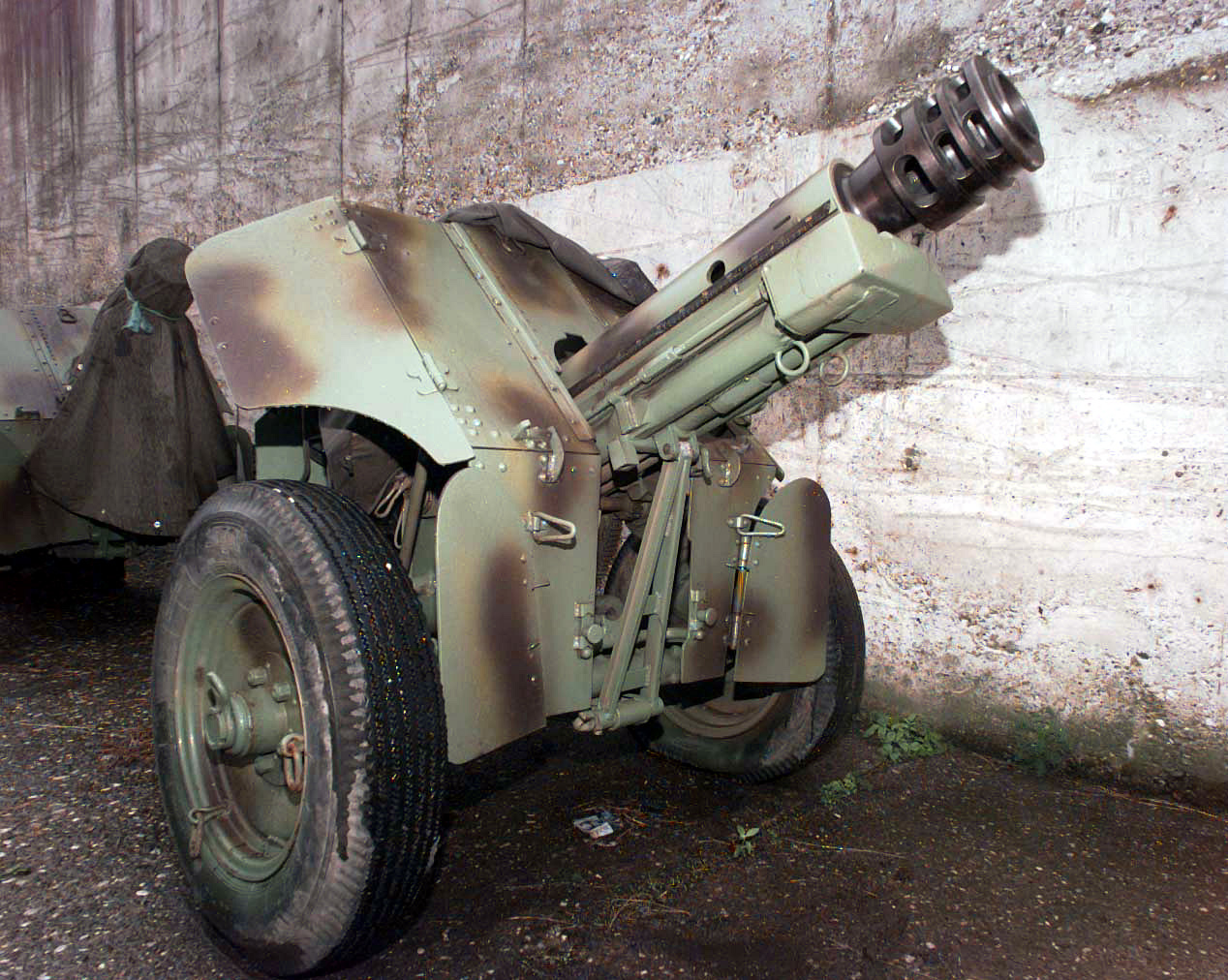
A close-up view of an M48 76mm mountain gun belonging to the 28th Division, 281st Brigade, 1st Tank Battalion, stationed in Visca.

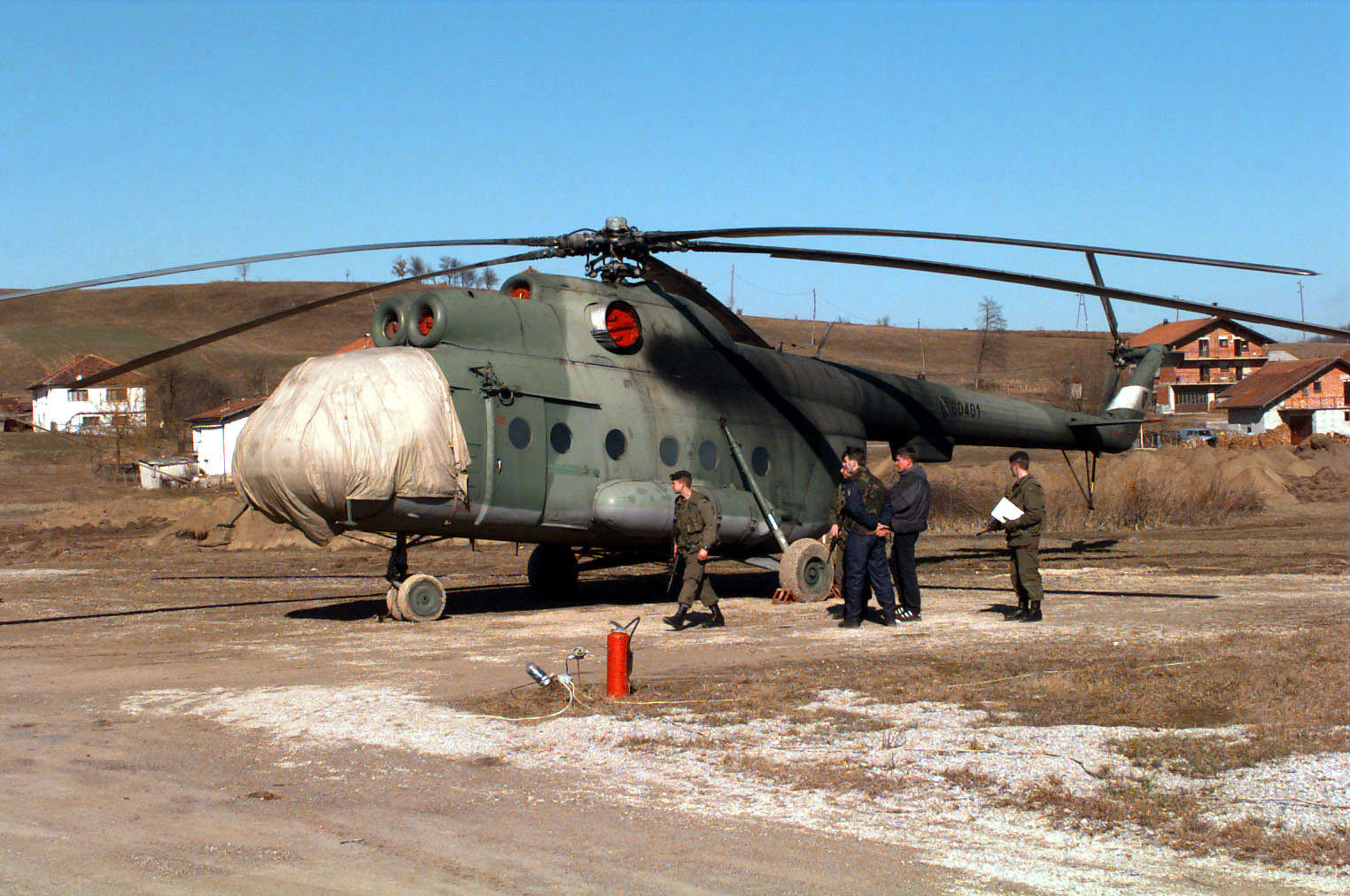
Main aircraft of ARBiH were the Mi-8 and Mi-17 helicopters. Here is an Mi-8T displayed to SFOR personnel during an inspection at Ćoralići Airfield.

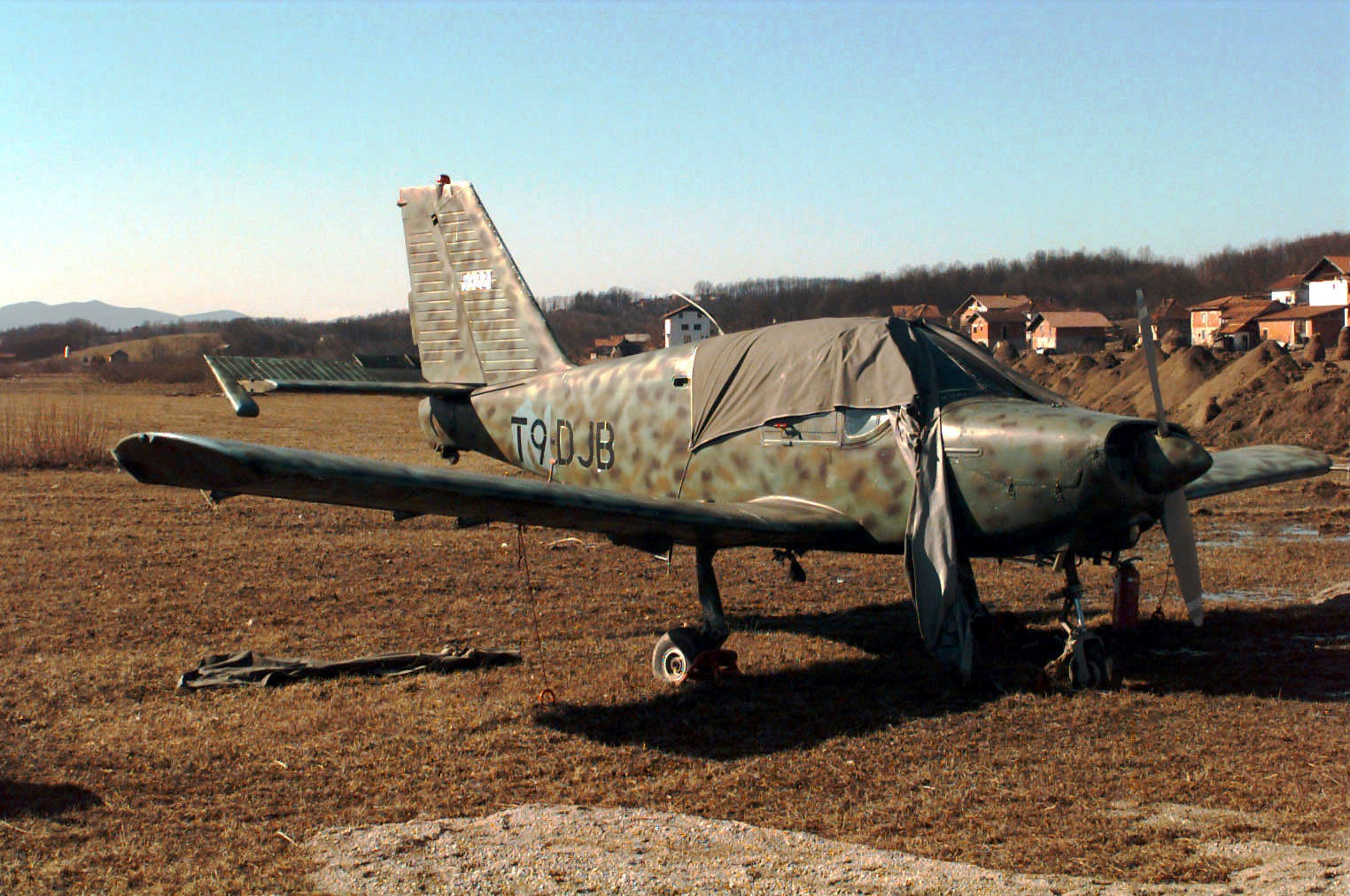
A Bosnian Army UTVA-75 light utility aircraft displayed as an artifact at Ćoralići Airfield in Bosnia and Herzegovina.

=== Infantry weapons of the Army of Bosnia and Herzegovina ===
==== Assault rifles and machine guns ====
Name	Origin	Type	Notes
MG42	Nazi Germany	Machine gun	World War II-spec model
Zastava M53	Yugoslavia	Machine gun	Provided from old JNA barracks in large numbers
M2 Browning machine gun	United States	Machine gun	Captured
DShK	Soviet Union	Machine gun	Captured and smuggled
NSV machine gun	Soviet Union	Machine gun	Captured, in smaller numbers
M48 Mauser	Yugoslavia	Bolt-action rifle	Some used as sniper rifles, fitted with ZRAK 4x32 telescopic sight
PAP M59/66	Yugoslavia	Semi-automatic rifle	In large numbers, used as sniper rifles or by paramilitary
Zastava M72	Yugoslavia	Assault rifle	In large numbers
Zastava M76	Yugoslavia	Sniper rifle	Captured/smuggled
Heckler & Koch MP5	West Germany	Submachine gun	Captured/smuggled, mainly used by the Military Police
AK-47 and its derivatives	Soviet Union	Assault rifle	In large numbers, mostly the Romanian PM md. 63
Zastava M70	Yugoslavia	Assault rifle	In large numbers
Škorpion vz. 61	Yugoslavia	Submachine gun	Designated as the M84 Škorpion
Dragunov Sniper Rifle	Soviet Union	Sniper rifle	Smuggled
G3	West Germany	Assault rifle	In low numbers
Zastava M84	Yugoslavia	Machine gun	In large numbers
Zastava M80	Yugoslavia	Assault rifle	Captured in small numbers
Thompson submachine gun	United States	Submachine gun	In low numbers (all provided from old JNA barracks)
PKM	Soviet Union	Machine gun	

==== Pistols ====
Pistol	Origin	Type	Versions	Notes
TT pistol	Soviet Union	Pistol		
CZ-99	Yugoslavia	Pistol		

==== Infantry anti-tank weapons ====
Name	Origin	Type	Versions	Notes
M80 Rocket Launcher	Yugoslavia	Rocket Launcher		64 millimetres (6.4 cm)
M79 Osa	Yugoslavia	Rocket Launcher		90 millimetres (9.0 cm)
AT-3 Sagger	Soviet Union	Anti-tank missile		
HJ-8	China	Anti-tank missile	Baktar-Shikan, HJ-8E	Was supplied to ARBiH in 1993-1995 by the Inter-Services Intelligence of Pakistan
RPG-7	Soviet Union	Rocket-propelled grenade		

=== Artillery ===
Artillery	Origin	Type	Versions	Notes
D-30	Soviet Union	Howitzer	D-30J	Captured
BM-21 Grad	Soviet Union	Multiple rocket launcher	BM-21 Grad/RM-70	
M-63	Yugoslavia	Multiple rocket launcher	M-63 Plamen	
M-77	Yugoslavia	Multiple rocket launcher	M-77 Oganj	
M-87	Yugoslavia	Multiple rocket launcher		Few
Type 63 multiple rocket launcher	China	Multiple rocket launcher		Large numbers

=== Tanks ===
Tanks	Origin	Type	Notes
T-34	Soviet Union	Medium Tank	46 tanks
M-84	Yugoslavia	Main battle tank	Captured, 3 vehicles.
T-55	Soviet Union	Main battle tank	60 tanks
PT-76	Soviet Union	Light tank	at least 2 vehicles captured
M47 Patton	United States	Main battle tank	8-13 tanks

=== Armored personnel carriers ===
APC	Origin	Notes
BVP M-80	Yugoslavia	
OT M-60	Yugoslavia	
BOV (APC)	Yugoslavia	From police and captured from the VRS.
BRDM-2	Soviet Union	~3 vehicles

=== Self-propelled anti-aircraft artillery ===
System	Origin	Notes
ZSU-57-2	Soviet Union	<10 vehicles
M53/59 Praga	Czechoslovakia	<5 vehicles

=== Anti-aircraft artillery ===
System	Origin	Notes
Bofors 40 mm	Sweden	
ZU-23-2	Soviet Union	Mainly used against ground targets

=== Self-propelled artillery ===
System	Origin	Notes
2S1 Gvozdika	Soviet Union	(captured 1994-95)
M36 tank destroyer	United States	
M18 Hellcat	United States	

== See also ==
- Bosnian War
- 1992 Yugoslav campaign in Bosnia
- Intra-Bosnian Muslim War
- Croat–Bosniak War
- Croatian War of Independence

== Bibliography ==
- Ramet, Sabrina P.; Stan, Lavinia (2024). East Central Europe since 1989: Politics, Culture, and Society. Routledge. ISBN 978-1-139-48750-4.
- Ramet, Sabrina P.; Stan, Lavinia (2010). East Central Europe since 1989: Politics, Culture, and Society. Routledge. ISBN 978-1-032-31920-9.
- Viktor Bezruchenko (2022). The Civil War in Bosnia and Herzegovina (1992-95): Political, Military, and Diplomatic History. Houston, TX: Strategic Book Publishing. ISBN 978-1682357125.
- Lauterpacht, Elihu; Greenwood, C. J.; Oppenheimer, A. G. (2002). International Law Reports. Vol. 122. Cambridge University Press. ISBN 978-0-521-80775-3.
- Bougarel, Xavier (2017). Islam and Nationhood in Bosnia-Herzegovina: Surviving Empires. Bloomsbury Publishing. ISBN 978-1-350-00360-6.
