= Stjepan Šiber =

Bosnian brigadier general and politician (1938–2016)

Member of the House of Representatives

Personal details
- Born: 20 August 1938 Gradačac, Kingdom of Yugoslavia
- Died: 25 August 2016 (aged 78) Sarajevo, Bosnia and Herzegovina
- Party: Republican Party

Military service
- Allegiance: Yugoslavia; Bosnia and Herzegovina
- Branch/service: Yugoslav People's Army; Army of the Republic of Bosnia and Herzegovina
- Rank: Brigadier general
- Battles/wars: Bosnian War

Stjepan Šiber (20 August 1938 – 25 August 2016) was a Bosnian Croat brigadier general and politician. After finishing high school in Gradačac, he went to Ljubljana, where he finished schooling at the military academy. Afterward, he became an officer in the Yugoslav People's Army. By 1992, he had become a lieutenant colonel. In 2000, he was elected to the House of Representatives of Bosnia and Herzegovina.

== Biography ==
Stjepan Šiber was born on 20 August 1938 in Gradačac. His great-grandfather was a German immigrant. Šiber completed primary and secondary school in Gradačac, and then went to Ljubljana in 1957 to attend the Military Academy of the Yugoslav People's Army. After graduating from the academy, he became an active officer in the Yugoslav People's Army. By 1992, he had risen to the rank of colonel.

In April 1992, when the war in Bosnia and Herzegovina began, Šiber became subordinate to the Presidency of Bosnia and Herzegovina. Alija Izetbegović proposed that he become the commander of the ARBiH, but Šiber refused because the Minister of Defense of Bosnia and Herzegovina was Croat. He was appointed deputy commander of the ARBiH. He was accepted into a seat in the Presidency of Bosnia and replaced the commanding general of the army.

In December 1993, he was promoted to brigadier general and soon appointed military attaché at the Embassy of Bosnia and Herzegovina in Switzerland in Bern. During the war, he received offers from Mate Boban, President of the Croatian Republic of Herzeg-Bosnia, and Milivoj Petković, Chief of the HVO General Staff, to join the Croatian Defence Council, but he refused such offers.

Šiber advocated a unified Bosnia and Herzegovina based on civic democracy. During the war, he stated that "He was born a Croat by chance and could have been born a Gypsy ". At the outbreak of the Bosniak-Croatian conflict, he sided with the Muslim - Bosniak side and criticized the Croatian Republic of Herzeg-Bosnia. After the Washington Agreement, Šiber advocated the abolition of the Croatian Defense Council, but was opposed by Alija Izetbegović.

On 31 December 1996, he learned through a television program that he had been forced into retirement.

== Post–War ==
In 2000, he was elected to the House of Representatives of Bosnia and Herzegovina. He was a member of the Republican Party, together with Stjepan Kljuić, a fellow wartime member of the Presidency of Bosnia and Herzegovina. Later, he moved to the Patriotic Party of Bosnia and Herzegovina and became its vice president.
