= Varnava Nastić =

American bishop and saint (1914–1964)

Saint Varnava the New Confessor
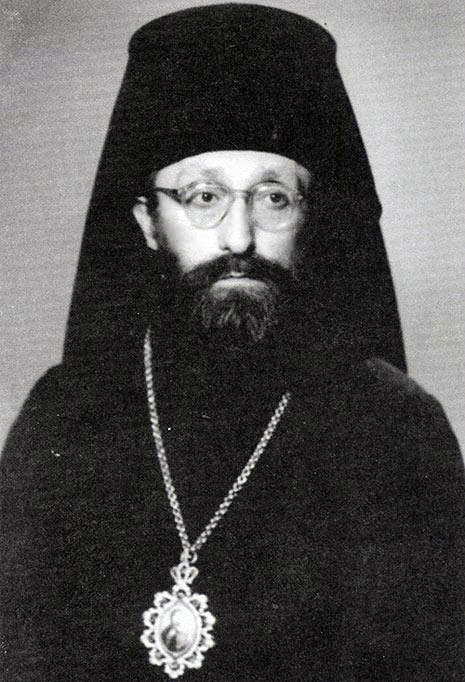

Bishop, Hierarch, New Confessor
- Born: Vojislav Nastić; 31 January 1914; Gary, Indiana, United States
- Died: 12 November 1964 (aged 50); Beočin Monastery, SFR Yugoslavia
- Honored in: Eastern Orthodox Church
- Canonized: 15 May 2005, Žitomislić Monastery by Serbian Orthodox Church
- Feast: October 30 (Julian calendar) November 12 (New Style)

Varnava the New Confessor (Serbian: Варнава Нови Исповедник. 31 January 1914 – 12 November 1964) was the titular bishop of Hvosno and a saint of the Serbian Orthodox Church. His feast is October 30 on the Julian calendar. He is one of the American Saints along with Alexis Toth, Alexander Hotovitzky, Herman of Alaska, and Peter the Aleut.

== Life ==
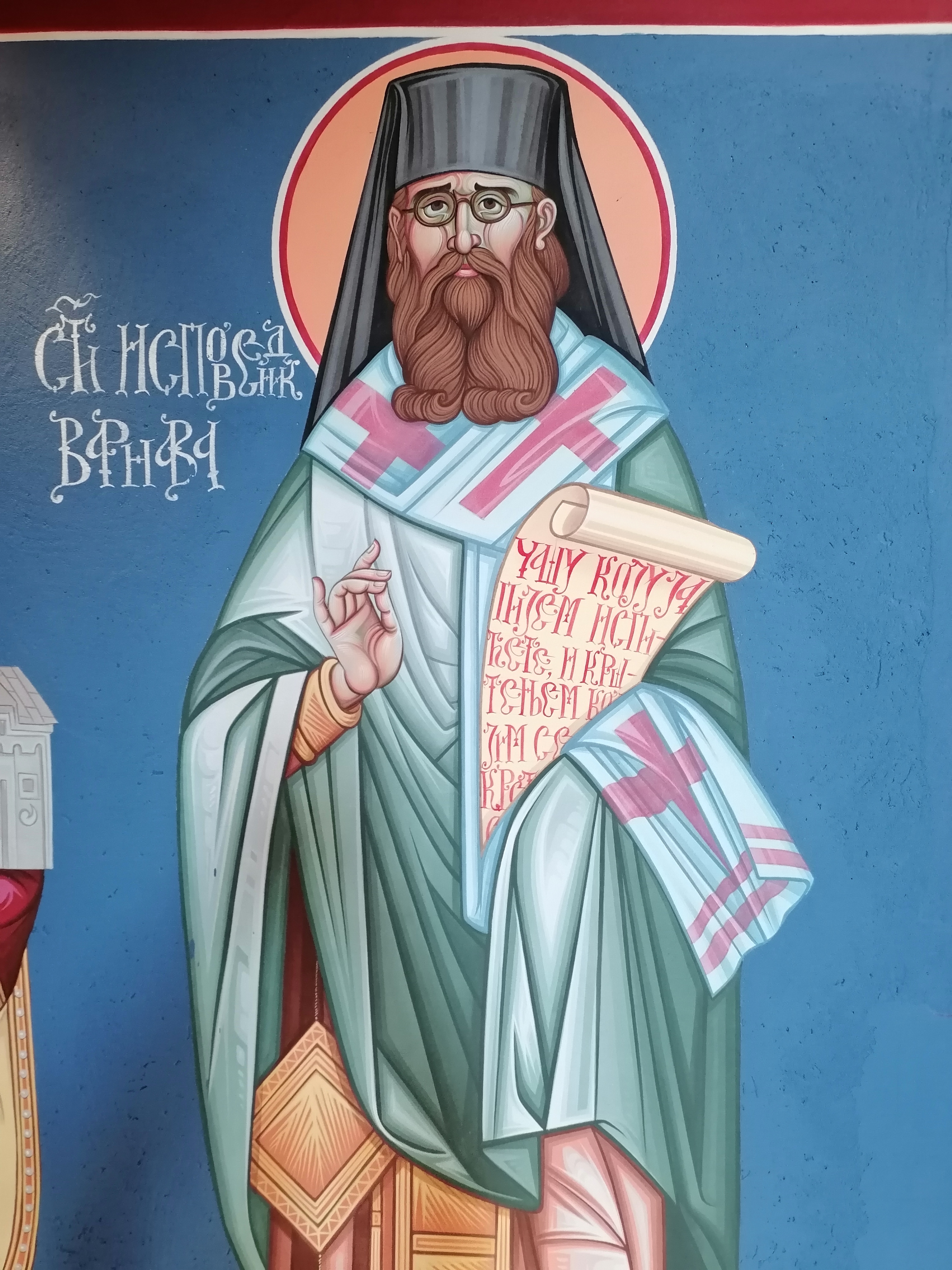
Icon of Nastić

=== Early life and education ===
He was born Vojislav Nastić in Gary, Indiana, on 31 January 1914, into a family of Serbian immigrants. His parents were Atanasije and Zorka (née Laković) Nastić, and the family attended the St. Sava Serbian Orthodox Church, which was then in Gary and is now located in Merrillville. Nastić was baptized there and later served as an altar boy at St. Sava. While living in Gary, he was first recognized as a prodigy in reciting Serbian traditional epic poetry.

In 1923, when Nastić was still a child, the family returned to their homeland, Yugoslavia. He attended high school in Sarajevo, graduating in 1933. He continued his education at the University of Belgrade's Faculty of Orthodox Theology, graduating in 1937. After graduating, he taught as a catechist in two high schools in Sarajevo.

=== Role as member of the clergy ===
In 1940, Nastić took monastic vows in the Mileševa Monastery, receiving the monastic name Varnava (Barnabas) after Apostle Barnabas of the Seventy and the Serbian Patriarch Varnava (Rosić). Varnava was ordained hierodeacon by Metropolitan Bishop Petar of Dabar-Bosna. Varnava remained in Sarajevo during World War II.

After the war in 1947, he was ordained hieromonk and raised to the rank of protosyncellus by Bishop Nektarije of Zvornik and Tuzla. In its first regular session, the Holy Assembly of the Serbian Orthodox Church elected Varnava the auxiliary bishop to the Serbian Patriarch with the title Bishop of Hvosno, with the responsibility of administering the Diocese of Dabar-Bosnia. On 28 August, 1947, he received the episcopal consecration by Patriarch Gavrilo, bishop Nektarije, and bishop Vikentije of Zletovo and Strumica.

=== Treason charges and death ===
Bishop Varnava preached numerous sermons denouncing Communism, which attracted the attention of the Yugoslavian government and led to his arrest on December 25, 1947. He was sentenced to 11 years in prison in 1948. Bishop Varnava was sent to the prison in Zenica, but because of his popularity among the prisoners, he was transferred to Sremska Mitrovica in 1950. During the transfer, the passenger train in which he was riding was struck by a freight train, and Bishop Varnava was severely injured, having to be hospitalized for several months.

Numerous groups, including the Holy Synod of Bishops and the U.S. Embassy, intervened on his behalf, and the government agreed to release Bishop Varnava on the condition of his retirement from the clergy. After being granted early retirement in 1951, he was conditionally released under house arrest and remained under government surveillance.

Bishop Varnava died unexpected on 12 November 1964, and was buried at Beočin Monastery. The circumstances of his death were considered suspicious by relatives and members of the clergy who suspected the Communist regime of poisoning him. No autopsy could be conducted.

== Veneration ==
Varnava Nastić was canonized on 15 May 2005. His feast day is celebrated on November 12 (October 30 O.S.).
