= Eparchy of Bihać and Petrovac =

Diocese of the Serbian Orthodox Church

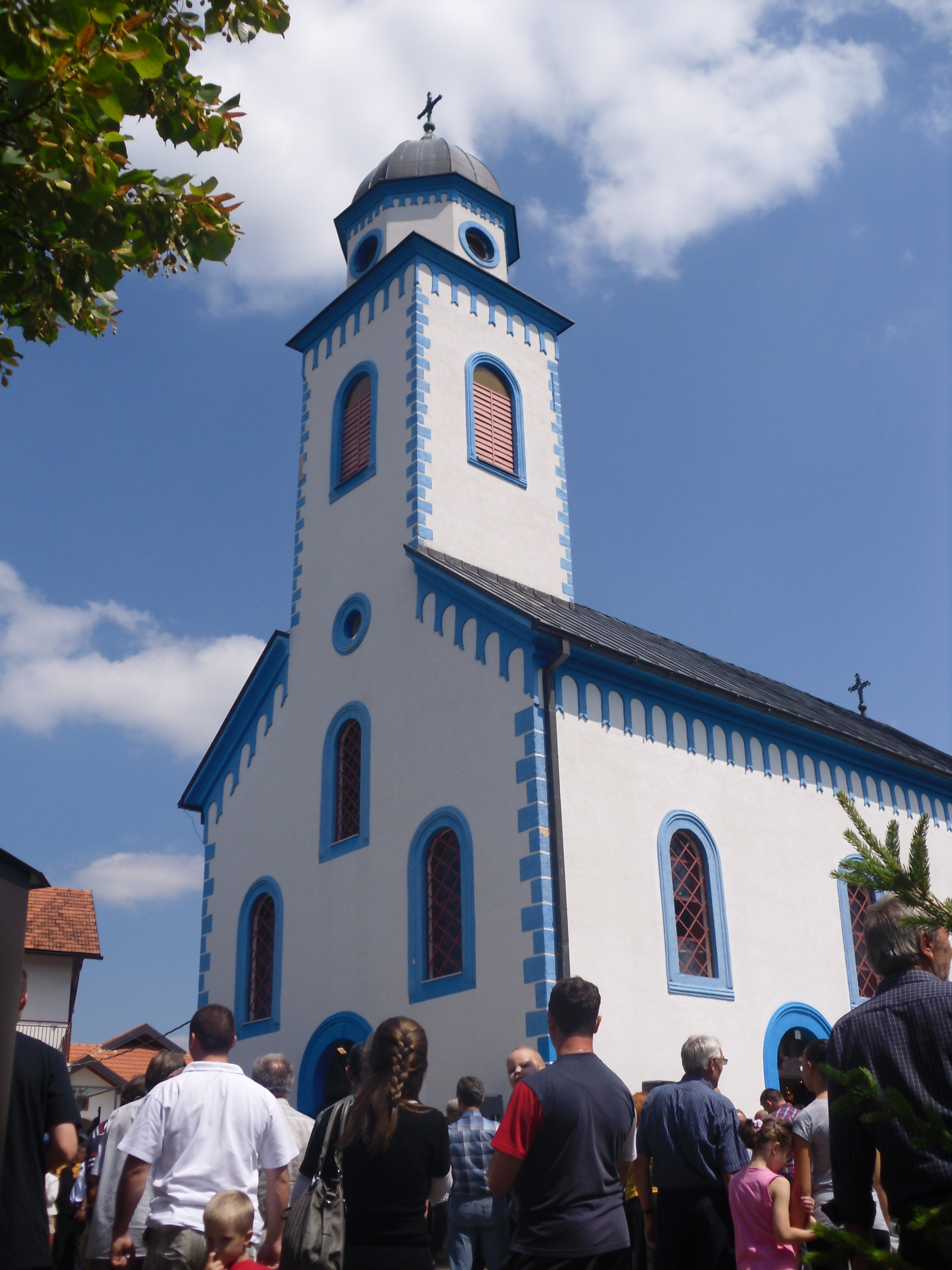
- Saints Peter and Paul Cathedral, Bosanski Petrovac

Location
- Territory: western Bosnia and Herzegovina
- Headquarters: Bosanski Petrovac, Bosnia and Herzegovina

Information
- Denomination: Eastern Orthodox
- Sui iuris church: Serbian Orthodox Church
- Established: 1925 (Bihać); 1990 (Bihać and Petrovac)
- Cathedral: Saints Peter and Paul Cathedral, Bosanski Petrovac
- Language: Church Slavonic, Serbian

Current leadership
- Bishop: Sergije Karanović

Map

Website
- Eparchy of Bihać and Petrovac

The Eparchy of Bihać and Petrovac (Serbian: Епархија бихаћко-петровачка, romanized: Eparhija bihaćko-petrovačka) is a diocese (eparchy) of the Serbian Orthodox Church covering western regions of Bosnia and Herzegovina.

The episcopal see is located at the Saints Peter and Paul Cathedral, Bosanski Petrovac. Its headquarters and bishop's residence are also in Bosanski Petrovac.

== History ==
The territory of this diocese for centuries belonged to the Metropolitanate of Dabar and Bosnia. Upon the request of the Eastern Orthodox Serbs from its western regions, new Eparchy of Banja Luka was created in 1900, with seat in the city of Banja Luka with regions of Bihać and Bosanski Petrovac belonging to this newly-formed eparchy.

After World War I and the creation of the Kingdom of Yugoslavia, a council of Eastern Orthodox bishops in Bosnia and Herzegovina unanimously decided to unite with other Serbian ecclesiastical provinces to form the unified Serbian Orthodox Church, a process completed in 1920. Regions of Bihać and Bosanski Petrovac belonged to the Eparchy of Banja Luka until 1925 when new Eparchy of Bihać was established. In 1931, when Constitution of the Serbian Orthodox Church was adopted, the process of reorganization of eparchies was initiated and their number was reduced. One of the abolished eparchies was the Eparchy of Bihać and its territory was returned to Eparchy of Banja Luka. In 1990, upon the requests of the Eastern Orthodox Serbs from the region, eparchy was restored by the Holy Assembly of the Serbian Orthodox Church under the name Eparchy of Bihać and Petrovac. The first bishop of the renewed eparchy was Hrizostom Jević, from 1991 to 2013 when Atanasije Rakita was elected the new Bishop of Bihać and Petrovac. In 2017, Sergije Karanović was elected new bishop of Bihać and Petrovac.

== List of bishops ==
=== Bishops of Bihać ===
- Venjamin Taušanović (1925–1929)

=== Bishops of Bihać and Petrovac ===
- Hrizostom Jević (1991–2013)
- Atanasije Rakita (2013–2017)
- Sergije Karanović (2017–present)

== Notable monasteries ==
- Rmanj
- Glogovac
- Veselinje

== Gallery ==
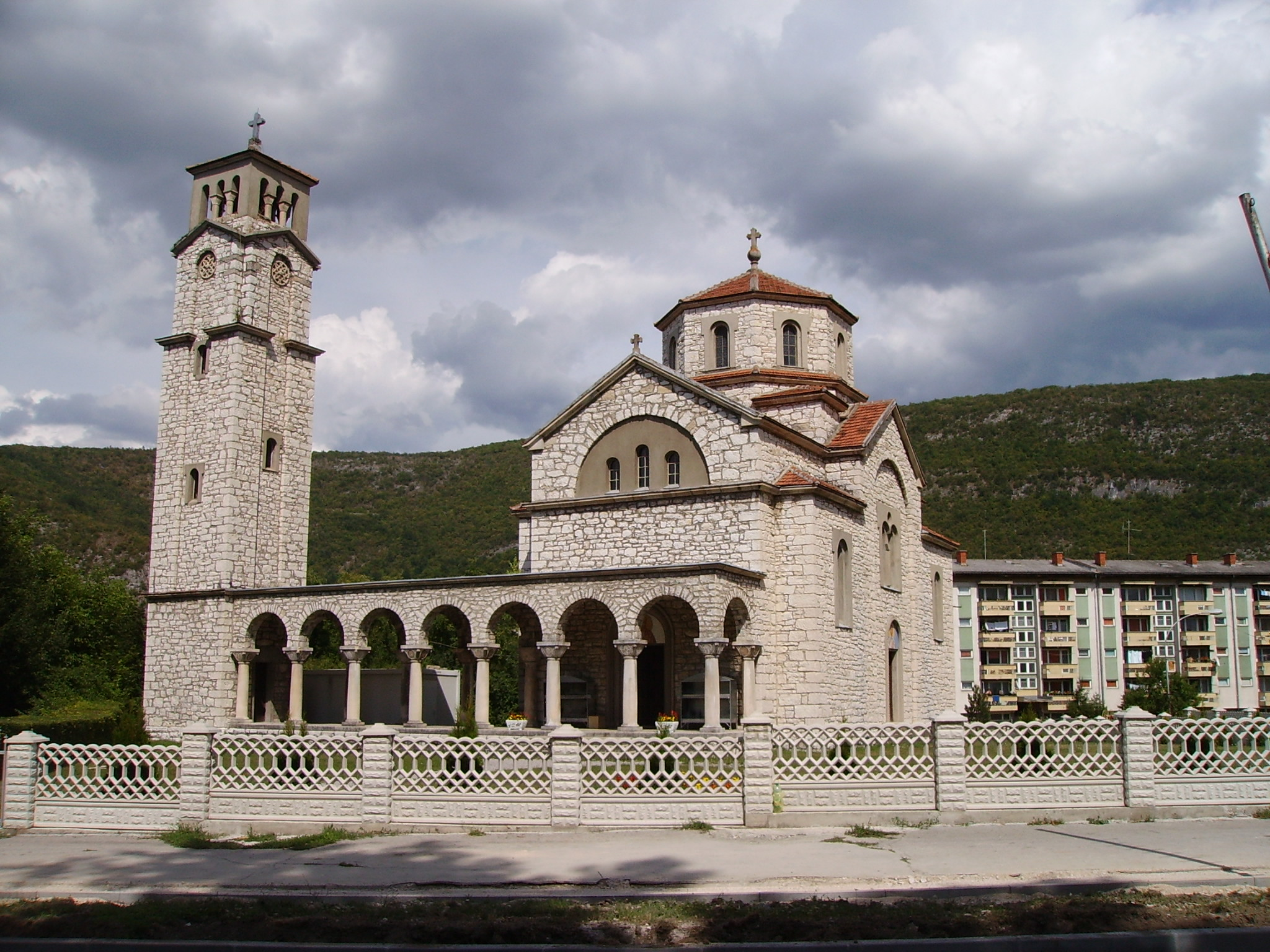
Church of Saint Sava
(Drvar)

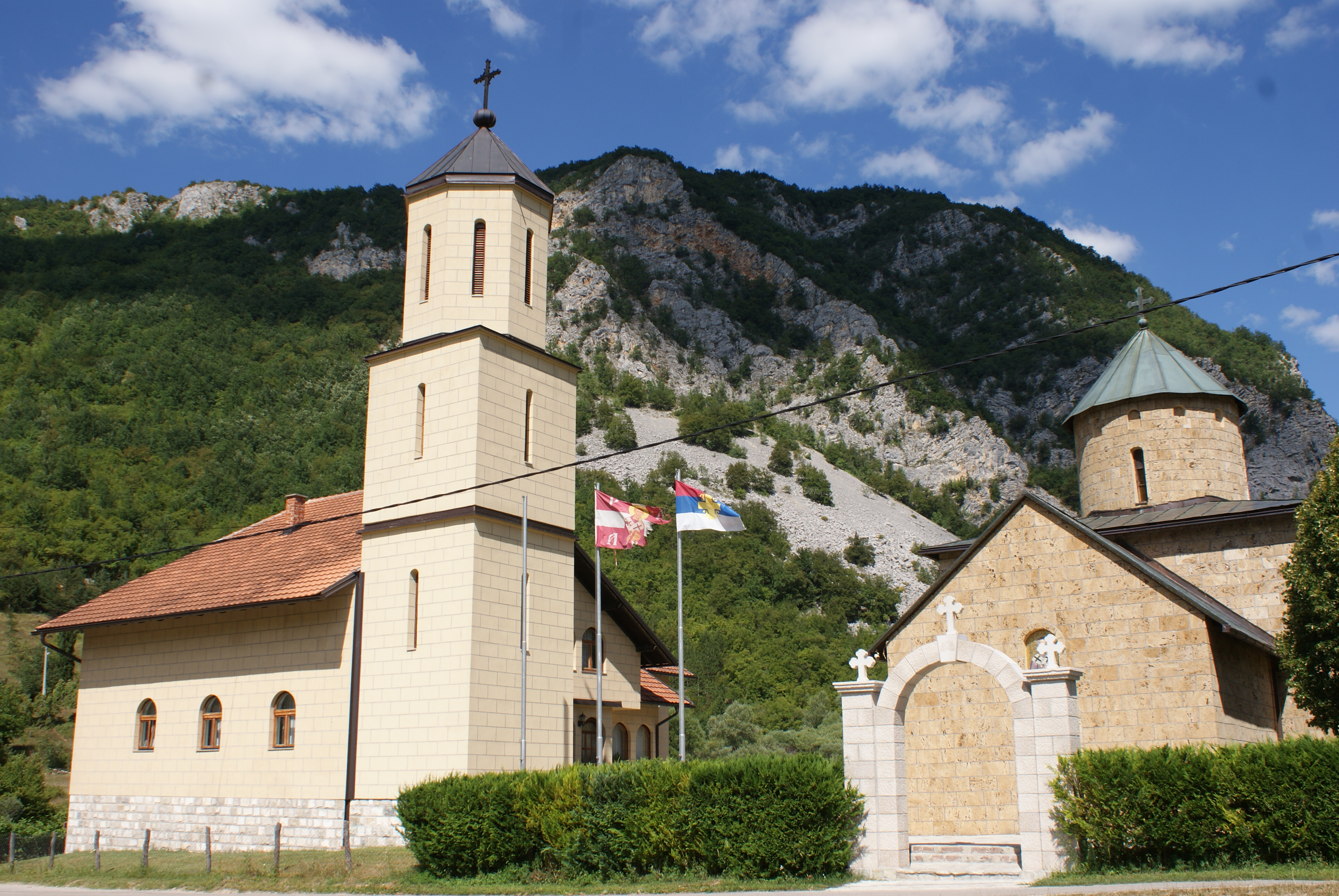
Rmanj Monastery

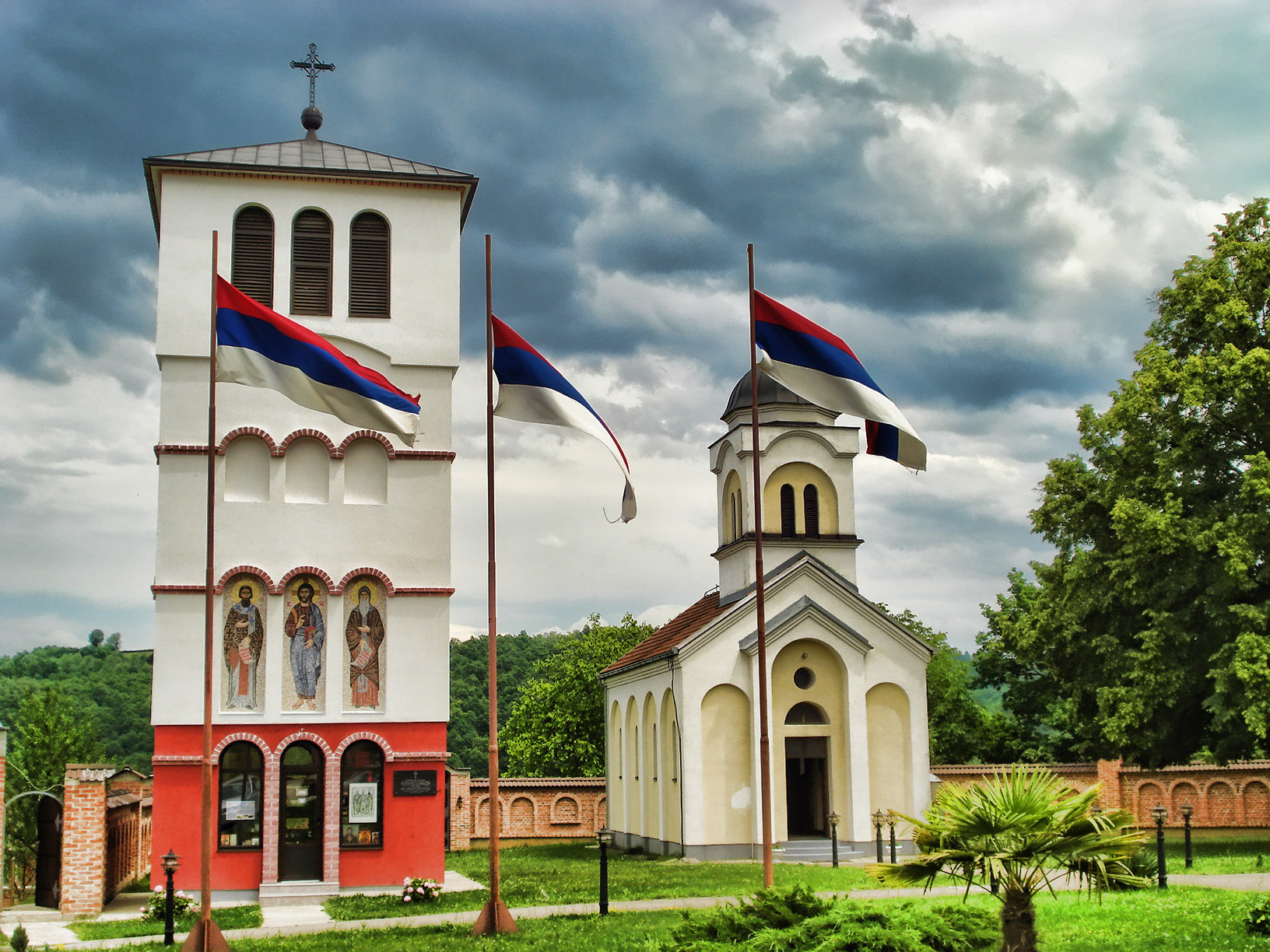
Klisina Monastery

== See also ==
- Eastern Orthodoxy in Bosnia and Herzegovina
- Eparchies and metropolitanates of the Serbian Orthodox Church
- Serbs of Bosnia and Herzegovina

== Bibliography ==
- Kašić, Dušan, ed. (1965). Serbian Orthodox Church: Its past and present. Vol. 1. Belgrade: Serbian Orthodox Church.
- Вуковић, Сава (1996). Српски јерарси од деветог до двадесетог века (Serbian Hierarchs from the 9th to the 20th Century). Евро, Унирекс, Каленић.
- Bataković, Dušan T. (1996). The Serbs of Bosnia & Herzegovina: History and Politics. Dialogue Association. ISBN 9782911527104.
- Mileusnić, Slobodan (1997). Spiritual Genocide: A survey of destroyed, damaged and desecrated churches, monasteries and other church buildings during the war 1991–1995 (1997). Belgrade: Museum of the Serbian Orthodox Church.
- Radić, Radmila (1998). "Serbian Orthodox Church and the War in Bosnia and Herzegovina". Religion and the War in Bosnia. Atlanta: Scholars Press. pp. 160–182. ISBN 9780788504280.
- Ćirković, Sima (2004). The Serbs. Malden: Blackwell Publishing. ISBN 9781405142915.
- Kiminas, Demetrius (2009). The Ecumenical Patriarchate: A History of Its Metropolitanates with Annotated Hierarch Catalogs. Wildside Press LLC. ISBN 9781434458766.
