= Diocese of Banja Luka =

Diocese of Banja Luka may refer to:

- Serbian Orthodox Diocese of Banja Luka, diocese (eparchy) of the Serbian Orthodox Church, in western part of Bosnia and Herzegovina.
- Roman Catholic Diocese of Banja Luka, diocese of the Roman Catholic Church, in western part of Bosnia and Herzegovina.

== See also ==
- Banja Luka
- Eastern Orthodoxy in Bosnia and Herzegovina
- Catholic Church in Bosnia and Herzegovina
- Bishop of Banja Luka (disambiguation)
- Diocese of Mostar (disambiguation)
- Diocese of Sarajevo (disambiguation)
- Diocese of Trebinje (disambiguation)
