= Diocese of Sarajevo =

Diocese of Sarajevo may refer to:

- Serbian Orthodox Diocese of Sarajevo, former common name of the current Serbian Orthodox Metropolitanate of Dabar-Bosna, when its seat was in the city of Sarajevo
- Roman Catholic Diocese of Sarajevo, common name of the Roman Catholic Archdiocese of Sarajevo

== See also ==
- Sarajevo
- Catholic Church in Bosnia and Herzegovina
- Eastern Orthodoxy in Bosnia and Herzegovina
- Diocese of Banja Luka (disambiguation)
- Diocese of Trebinje (disambiguation)
- Diocese of Mostar (disambiguation)
