= Grigorije Živković =

Serbian bishop (1839–1909)

- Church: Serbian Orthodox Church
- Metropolis: Eparchy of Zvornik and Tuzla
- Installed: 1897
- Term ended: 1909

Personal details
- Born: 25 November 1839
- Died: 24 April 1909 (aged 69)
- Denomination: Serbian Orthodox

Grigorije Živković (wordly name: Nikola Živković; 25 November 1839 - 24 April 1909) was a bishop of the Serbian Orthodox Church.

== Biography ==
Nikola Živković was born on 25 November 1839 in the Banija village of Meminska, near Kostajnica, at the time in the Croatian Military Frontier, to father Grigorije, a theologian and archpriest, and mother Jelica. He completed elementary school in Dubica, and high school in Petrinja and Zagreb, and graduated from the Faculty of Theology at the Grandes écoles of Saint Arsenije Sremac in Sremski Karlovci.

Before joining the ranks of the priesthood, he was a teacher at Crkveni Bok, near Sunja for a while. He was ordained deacon on 8 September 1861, and in the rank of presbyter on 26 October of the same year by Metropolitan Petar Jovanović and appointed chaplain to his father in Dubica, followed by Crkveni Bok. Two years later, in 1863, he was appointed catechist in Rakovac, near Karlovac. He took his professorial exam in Vienna as a lecturer and teacher of Serbian and German languages. The examiner for Serbian and Croatian was the Slovene scholar Franz Miklosich. For many years Nikola Zivković was the rector of his alma mater in Sremski Karlovci, and at about the same time, he was a member of the Consistory court of Upper Karlovac, founded by Bishop Lukijan Mušicki and where Bishop Teofan Živković (1825-1890) distinguished himself as archpriest.

== Monastic life ==
After retiring in 1893, he received the monastic rank of hieromonk on Theodore's Sabbath (which falls before the Sabbath of Easter) the same year, and the monastic name of Grigorije (his father's name as well) before taking over the administration of Gomirje monastery as protopresbyter.

At the invitation of the metropolitan of the Dabar-Bosna, Grigorije moved to Sarajevo on 1 January 1897 as a member of the Consistory and was elevated to the rank of archimandrite. In the same year, he became metropolitan of the Eparchy of Zvornik and Tuzla where he was consecrated on 27 July 1897. He succeeded Metropolitan Bishop Nikolaj Mandić.

As a Metropolitan, he took part in the creation of the Decree of the Church-Educational Administration of the Serbian Orthodox Dioceses in the Austro-Hungarian province of Bosnia and Herzegovina "which became law there, and by that Decree, the Orthodox Serbs in Bosnia and Herzegovina were given the opportunity to concentrate their power on other national needs." As a long-time church-educator, Bishop Gregorije wrote: "History of the Christian Church" and "Liturgy" (the books came out in two editions, printed by Matica srpska), which were used as textbooks in grammar schools in Rakovac, Novi Sad and Sremski Karlovci, as well as in Serbian Orthodox Teacher's Academies. Finally, he prepared and published the "Collection of Orders of the Metropolitan Administration of the Serbian Orthodox Diocese of Zvornik and Tuzla."

He died on 24 April 1909 in Meminska and was buried in a cemetery in Karlovac.
