= Diocese of Trebinje =

Diocese of Trebinje may refer to:

- Roman Catholic Diocese of Trebinje, common name of the Diocese of Trebinje-Mrkan, with seat in the city of Trebinje
- Serbian Orthodox Diocese of Trebinje, former common name of the current Eparchy of Zahumlje and Herzegovina, when its seat was in the city of Trebinje

== See also ==
- Trebinje
- Catholic Church in Bosnia and Herzegovina
- Eastern Orthodoxy in Bosnia and Herzegovina
- Diocese of Banja Luka (disambiguation)
- Diocese of Sarajevo (disambiguation)
- Diocese of Mostar (disambiguation)
