= Diocese of Mostar =

Diocese of Mostar may refer to:

- Roman Catholic Diocese of Mostar, common name of the Roman Catholic Diocese of Mostar-Duvno, with seat in the city of Mostar
- Serbian Orthodox Diocese of Mostar, former common name of the current Serbian Orthodox Eparchy of Zahumlje and Herzegovina, when its seat was in the city of Mostar

== See also ==
- Mostar (disambiguation)
- Catholic Church in Bosnia and Herzegovina
- Eastern Orthodoxy in Bosnia and Herzegovina
- Diocese of Banja Luka (disambiguation)
- Diocese of Sarajevo (disambiguation)
- Diocese of Trebinje (disambiguation)
