= Vodenica =

Vodenica may refer to:

- Vođenica, a village in Bosnia and Herzegovina
- Vodenica (mountain), a mountain in Central Croatia
