= Mostar (disambiguation) =

Mostar is city and municipality in Bosnia and Herzegovina.

Mostar may also refer to:

- Mostar (magazine), Turkish monthly magazine
- Istočni Mostar, a village and municipality in Republika Srpska, Bosnia and Herzegovina
- Mostar (mobile radio), a Motorola two-way radio

== See also ==
- HT Mostar, a telecommunications company from Bosnia and Herzegovina
- Diocese of Mostar (disambiguation)
