= Vasilije Kačavenda =

Serbian Orthodox bishop

- Bishop emeritus
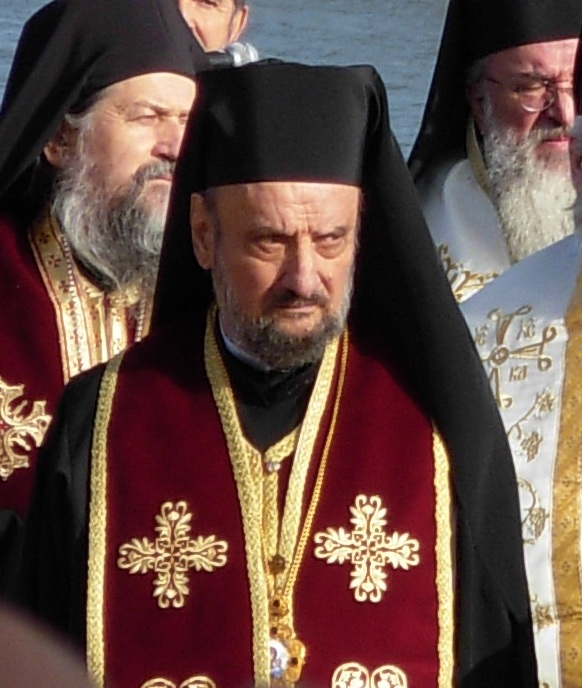
- Kačavenda in 2012
- Church: Serbian Orthodox Church
- Diocese: Zvornik and Tuzla
- Predecessor: Longin Tomić

Personal details
- Born: Ljubomir Kačavenda; 19 December 1938 (age 87) Sarajevo, Drina Banovina, Kingdom of Yugoslavia
- Residence: Bijeljina, Bosnia and Herzegovina

Vasilije Kačavenda (Serbian Cyrillic: Василије Качавенда; born 19 December 1938) is a retired Serbian Orthodox bishop and a former government minister from Bosnia and Herzegovina who served as the head of the Eparchy of Zvornik and Tuzla until his dismissal in 2013 due to a video of him raping an underage boy, and abuse claims.

== Biography ==
=== UDBA informant ===
Vasilije Kačavenda over the years had a reputation of being either homosexual or bisexual. From 1960 onward, Kačavenda worked closely with the communist Yugoslav Secret Service (UDBA). In a few sources it is suggested that these two factors were linked and resulted in forced collaboration with the Secret Service as they held sensitive material regarding his personal circumstances. The Secret Service viewed Kačavenda as a "reliable" informant in 1970 when he was still a monk, yet by 1988 he was a nationalist and a priest was recruited to monitor him. Kačavenda was an important figure within the nationalist network that could not be sidelined. Kačavenda's lifestyle did not conform to the social agenda of the Serbian Orthodox Church (SOC) and sources with knowledge on the situation viewed Kačavenda in a critical way, but were fearful of possible violent reprisals.

=== Yugoslav Wars and aftermath ===
In the early 1990s, Bishops Kačavenda and Amfilohije Radović deepened religious and ethnic divisions during the Yugoslav wars and alleged that a global conspiracy existed against the SOC. Kačavenda was a government minister of the self-declared Bosnian Serb entity Republika Srpska and strongly opposed abortion by advocating for state authorities and the SOC to oppose and ban the practice. At the time Kačavenda was an SOC figure of the radical clerical faction that favoured combat during the Bosnian war. Amid the Bosnian war, the SOC ordered its bishoprics to remove valuable religious artifacts to safe locations and the collections based at the Episcopal Museum at Tuzla were relocated in 1992 by Kačavenda to Bijeljina which became the new centre of his episcopal seat.

During the Bosnian War of the early 1990s, he was a government minister of the Bosnian Serb entity Republika Srpska and endorsed violence against Bosniak civilians. Kačavenda also had close ties with many Serbian nationalists, including Ratko Mladić, and is a nationalist himself.

The Bosnian Serb army during the Bosnian war gave the property of Muslims expelled by Arkan and his paramilitaries in Bijeljina to the SOC and Kačavenda constructed a large building that became his residence and included a monastery and an extensive garden. Space was needed for the project during construction and Kačavenda had 10 deserted homes belonging to Muslims demolished, and the area was close to the location of the Atik Mosque. Kačavenda was a strong supporter of Arkan.

Icons from the Church of the Cerement of the Virgin in Tešanj were unilaterally moved in 2001 to the episcopal seat at Bijeljina on orders from Kačavenda without any agreement with Bosnian authorities or the Heritage Protection Authority. In 2001, Vasilije strongly opposed the rebuilding of the Atik Mosque in Bijeljina, and he claimed in 2009 that the former Muslim structure was built atop a site that once contained an Orthodox church, yet evidence does not support that view. Years later after the war, a court ordered in 2005 that the legal owners of the expropriated land were to be compensated with 2 million Convertible Marks (or €1 million) that included interest.

He has lived in Bijeljina since 1992.

=== Blažanović case ===
The SOC has never officially investigated the charges made about him that include an encounter with a stripper from Novi Sad and the case of a theology student Milić Blažanović, who refused Kačavenda's advances and later was allegedly killed (1999) after he began to discuss the matter with others. An exception exists by Grigorije Durić, a bishop reportedly under the protection of Bosnian Serb leader Milorad Dodik. In the account given by the newspaper Borba, Grigorije, at an Assembly of Bishops (2008) confronted Kačavenda about the Blažanović case that resulted in a breakdown and his hospitalisation. Kačavenda continued to be part of the Assembly of Bishops.

=== Candidate for Orthodox Serb Patriarch ===
In the late 2000s the Serbian newspaper Standard alleged that bishops Amfilohije Radović and Kačavenda left a dying Patriarch Pavle in his role to extend time and increase their possibility of ascending to that office themselves. Kačavenda was unofficially the leader of the strong and influential "Bosnian lobby" and a representative of nationalism. He, along with Amfilohije and Irinej Bulović were the main candidates for SOC patriarch, even though Vasilije did not run for the position. Kačavenda and Durić, whose bishoprics are geographically nearby to each other represented different sides of discourse in the SOC.

=== 2012–13 sex abuse scandal ===
In November 2012, pornographic videos showing Kačavenda in sexual acts with young men were first given to his church's synod. Kačavenda submitted his resignation on 9 November, claiming "serious health problems". Not long after, he changed his mind and stayed on his post. When videos showing him performing oral sex on a young man were made public in April 2013, he said that he would fight the slanderous allegations against him, but announced his resignation as bishop on 22 April, which was accepted immediately. He was dismissed of all duties on 29 May 2013.

Serbian police in Belgrade arrested two men on 11 April 2013 for attempting to sell a video showing Bishop Kačavenda in sex acts with four young men. The video length was about an hour and a half. One of the men who was arrested was a deacon in Kačavenda's church and accused the bishop of pedophilia and stated that Kačavenda attempted to kiss him on the neck and "private parts of the body", which was eventually the reason why he left the church. Kačavenda has not been held to account by the SOC in any of its ecclesiastical courts. At the time of the scandal, fellow bishops were of the view that Kačavenda should stay in a monastery or visit Russia until the situation became calm.

=== Health problems ===
Kačavenda underwent surgery in Belgrade, a day after suffering a stroke in Bijeljina on 20 September 2013. He was again hospitalized less than two months later.

== Honors ==
Kačavenda received one of the highest decorations of the Republika Srpska entity, Order of the Republika Srpska, from its president, Milorad Dodik, in 2012.

Preceded by Longin Tomić	Bishop of Zvornik and Tuzla; 1978–2013	Succeeded by Hrizostom Jević
