= Hrizostom Jević =

Serbian Orthodox bishop (born 1952)

His Eminence Hrizostom Jević
- Metropolitan Bishop of Dabar and Bosnia
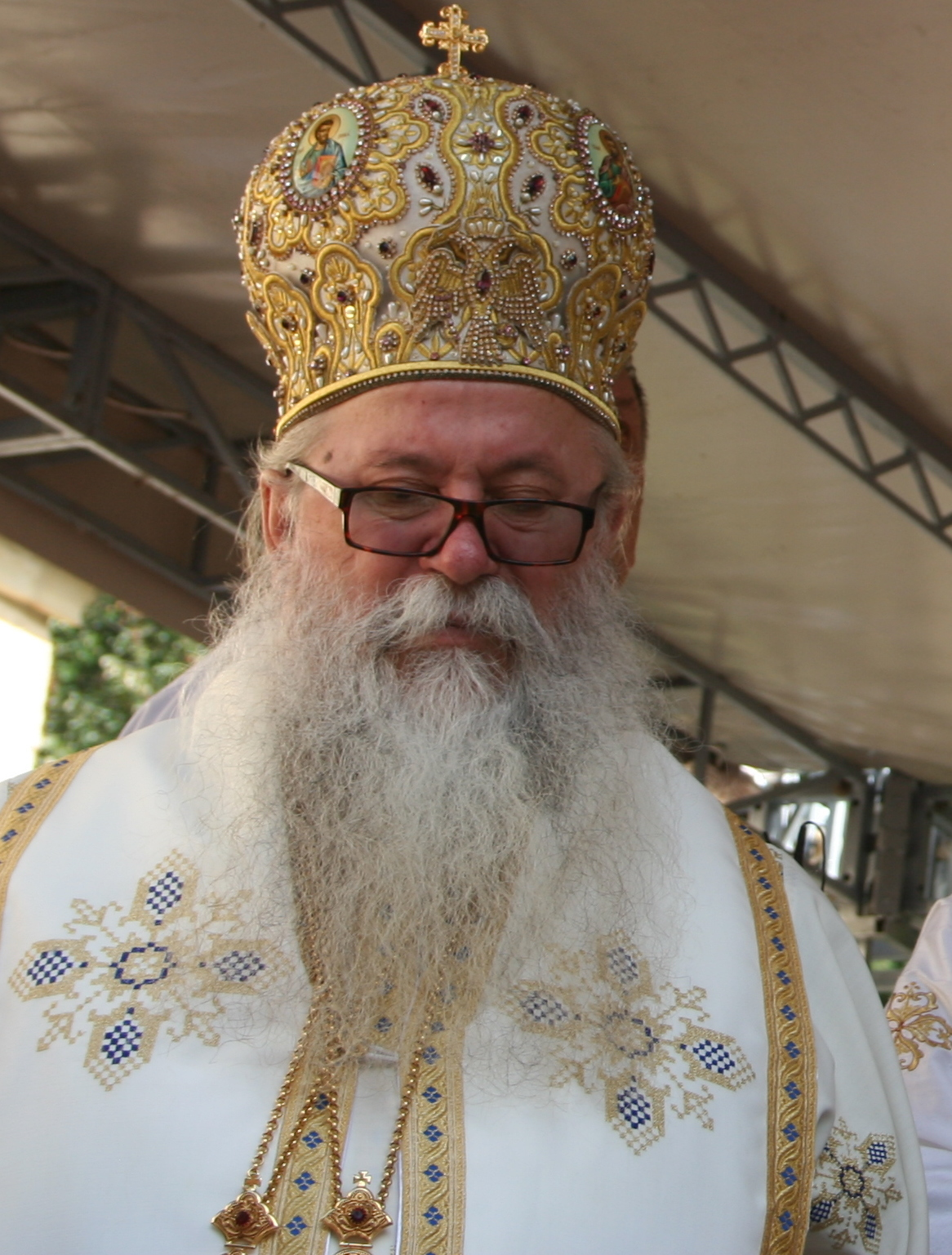
- Hrizostom Jević at the celebration of the 700th anniversary of the Tronoša Monastery, 2017
- Church: Serbian Orthodox Church
- Metropolis: Dabar and Bosnia
- Appointed: 24 May 2017
- Installed: 3 September 2017
- Predecessor: Nikolaj Mrđa
- Other post: Bishop of Bihać and Petrovac (1991–13) Bishop of Zvornik and Tuzla (2013–17)

Orders
- Ordination: 10 June 1973 by Stefan Boca
- Consecration: 4 August 1991 by Pavle, Serbian Patriarch

Personal details
- Born: Rajko Jević; 4 March 1952 (age 74) Vođenica, Bosanski Petrovac, Bosnia and Herzegovina, Yugoslavia
- Denomination: Serbian Orthodox
- Residence: Sokolac
- Education: Aristotle University of Thessaloniki

Hrizostom Jević (Serbian Cyrillic: Хризостом Јевић; born 4 March 1952) is a Bosnian prelate of the Serbian Orthodox Church. He has been the metropolitan bishop of Dabar and Bosnia since 2017. Jević, formerly a monk of the Krka monastery, has also served as bishop of Bihać and Petrovac (1991–2013) and Zvornik and Tuzla (2013–2017).

== Early life ==
Jević was born in Vođenica near Bosanski Petrovac to father Nikola and mother Rosa née Radošević. He finished elementary school with excellent grades in 1967. While still in elementary school, Jević expressed interest to become a priest, which his family opposed, which resulted in a one-year pause in his education. Eventually, in 1968 he enrolled at the five-year seminary at the Krka monastery in Kistanje in Croatia, from where he graduated in 1973, also with excellent grades. While at the seminary, he was involved in singing and folklore. While at the fourth year of the seminary, Jević took monastic vows in front of Bishop Stefan Boca of Dalmatia on 20 September 1971, and took the name Hrizostom. Jević became a deacon on 27 September 1971 and was ordained a priest at the Krka monastery on 10 June 1973 by Boca.

From 1973 to 1974, Jević served in the military in Kraljevo. After the military service, Jević was appointed a secretary of the Church court of the Eparchy of Dalmatia in Šibenik. He enrolled at the Faculty of Theology in Belgrade as a part-time student, but because of duties in the eparchy as well as the parish of Skradin where he occasionally served, he ended his theological studies. In 1975, however, the Holy Synod of the Serbian Orthodox Church allowed him to study theology in Bucharest, Romania. However, due to political tensions between Yugoslavia and Romania involving Vlado Dapčević, Jević never went to Bucharest. In January 1976, Boca sent him to Thessaloniki, Greece to study Greek and theology at the Aristotle University. There he studied from 1976 until his graduation summa cum laude in 1980. Simultaneously, from 1978 to 1979, he attended French courses in Paris.

Influenced by starets Nikanor Savić, Jević entered the Hilandar monastery in Mount Athos. At the request of the new Bishop of Dalmatia Nikolaj Mrđa, Jević returned to teach at the seminary in the Krka monastery, where he remained from September 1981 to September 1991. There, he held various monastic duties besides lecturing.

== Episcopate ==
The Holy Synod appointed him the bishop of the newly created Eparchy of Bihać and Petrovac on 23 May 1991 and was installed on 4 August 1991 in the Church of Saint Sava in Drvar. The Eparchy of Bihać and Petrovac was previously administered by Mrđa. Jević served as bishop of Bihać and Petrovac for 22 years, until his appointment in the Eparchy of Zvornik and Tuzla on 1 June 2013. He was installed as the bishop of Zvornik and Tuzla on 13 July 2013 at the cathedral in Bijeljina.

On 24 May 2017, Jević was appointed metropolitan bishop of Dabar and Bosnia, succeeding Mrđa, who previously served as the bishop of Dalmatia. Jević was installed on 3 September 2017 at the Cathedral of the Nativity of the Theotokos in Sarajevo.

== Notes ==
Eastern Orthodox Church titles
New diocese	Bishop of Bihać and Petrovac; 1991–2013	Succeeded by Atanasije (Rakita)
Preceded by Vasilije (Kačavenda)	Bishop of Zvornik and Tuzla; 2013–2017	Succeeded by Fotije (Sladojević)
Preceded by Nikolaj (Mrđa)	Metropolitan Bishop of Dabar and Bosnia; 2017–present	Incumbent
