= Veselinje Monastery =

Serbian Orthodox monastery near Glamoč, Bosnia and Herzegovina

Coordinates: 44.015430°N 16.898372°E

The Veselinje Monastery (Serbian: Манастир Веселиње, romanized: Manastir Veseljenje) is a Serbian Orthodox monastery dedicated to John the Baptist and located at the village of Vrba 5 km (3.1 mi) south-east of the town of Glamoč, in western Bosnia and Herzegovina. The monastery's church, consecrated on 10 August 1975, was built without intention to found a monastery around it. The ktitor of the church was Veselin Nearlović, a businessman from Buenos Aires, Argentina, who was born in Vrba. After the ktitor agreed with the idea to establish a monastery at the church, monastic buildings were constructed, and the Veselinje Monastery was consecrated on 8 April 1985.

The church was built at the site of an earlier, wooden church, which was erected in 1865. It was burned down during World War II, in 1941, by the Ustaše, Croatian fascists. The Ustaše also brutally tortured and murdered the parish priest of Vrba, Simo Banjac, whom the Serbian Orthodox Church canonised as a martyr in 2003. In 1995, at the end of the Bosnian War, the Croatian Army took control of the Municipality of Glamoč. The monastery was subsequently devastated and its valuables were stolen, but it was restored in 1998.

The Veselinje Monastery owns three bells made in 1879, 1933, and 1936, respectively. Two of them belonged to the old Serbian Orthodox church in Glamoč, destroyed by the Ustaše, while the third bell belonged to the earlier wooden church. A memorial chapel, dedicated to the Serbs who were murdered by the Ustaše in the Municipality of Glamoč, was built at the monastery and consecrated in 2012 by Serbian Patriarch Irinej. As of July 2012, remains of 806 murdered Serbs, exhumed from mass graves, have been buried in the crypt at the chapel. Around 300 metres from the monastery lie the ruins of a church dated to the 5th century. Ancient tombstones found at that church are displayed in the monastery's yard. The village of Vrba is situated on the site of the Roman municipium Salvium, which was last mentioned as an extant town in 533.

== See also ==
- List of Serbian Orthodox monasteries
