= Nektarije Krulj =

Serbian Eastern Orthodox bishop (1879–1966)

His Eminence Nektarije
- Metropolitan of Dabar and Bosnia
- Church: Serbian Orthodox Church
- See: Sarajevo
- Installed: 1951
- Term ended: 1966
- Predecessor: Petar (Zimonjić)
- Successor: Vladislav (Mitrović)
- Other post: Bishop of Zvornik and Tuzla (1928–1951)
- Previous post: Bishop of Zachlumia and Raška (1925–1928)

Orders
- Ordination: 1912
- Consecration: 16 May 1926 by Patriarch Dimitrije (Pavlović)

Personal details
- Born: Nikola Krulj; 30 November 1879 Pocrnje (Ljubinje), Condominium of Bosnia and Herzegovina
- Died: 7 September 1966 (aged 86) Sarajevo, SR Bosnia and Herzegovina, SFR Yugoslavia
- Buried: Church of the Holy Archangels Michael and Gabriel
- Denomination: Eastern Orthodox Church

Nektarije Krulj (Serbian Cyrillic: Нектарије Круљ; secular name: Nikola Krulj; Serbian Cyrillic: Никола Круљ; 30 November 1879 – 7 September 1966) was a Serbian Orthodox bishop.

== Biography ==
The son of Vukan and Vida, he graduated from high school in Mostar and then from the theological seminary in Reljevo. In 1907, the year he graduated, he became secretary of the church court in Mostar, a position he held for five years, while simultaneously studying law in Vienna and Zagreb, where he defended his doctoral dissertation in 1911.

In 1912, he was ordained a deacon and then a presbyter. He began teaching catechism in Mostar, Bihać, and Tuzla, after which he became a lecturer at the seminary in Sarajevo. In subsequent years, he served as rector of seminaries in Sremski Karlovci (Note: See Clerical High School of Saint Arsenije), Prizren (Note: See Serbian Orthodox Seminary (Prizren)), and Bitola. On 29 November 1925, he was appointed bishop of Zachlumia and Raška.

His episcopal ordination took place on 16 May 1926. Two years later, he was transferred to the cathedra of Zvornik and Tuzla. He actively supported the Orthodox People's Christian Community founded by Bishop Nikolaj of Ohrid, whose goal was to oppose atheism, communism, and the spread of the influence of the Seventh-day Adventist Church. The writings of Bishop Nikolaj also contained strong antisemitism. Bishop Nektarije organized the Community's congresses at the Tavna Monastery.

During World War II, he was transported by the German occupation authorities to Belgrade and participated in the work of the Holy Synod of the Serbian Orthodox Church under the leadership of Metropolitan Josif of Skopje. He then went to Niš, where he headed the theological seminary. Formally, he was also the administrator of the Serbian Orthodox eparchies in Croatia.

After the war, he returned to Zvornik, simultaneously serving as locum tenens of the Metropolitanate of Dabar and Bosnia and the Eparchy of Zachlumia and Herzegovina. In 1951, he became metropolitan bishop of Dabar and Bosnia. He worked to rebuild churches and monasteries destroyed during World War II. He remained in office until the end of his life; he was buried near the Church of the Holy Archangels Michael and Gabriel ("the Old Church") in Sarajevo.
