= Eparchy of Zvornik and Tuzla =

Diocese of the Serbian Orthodox Church

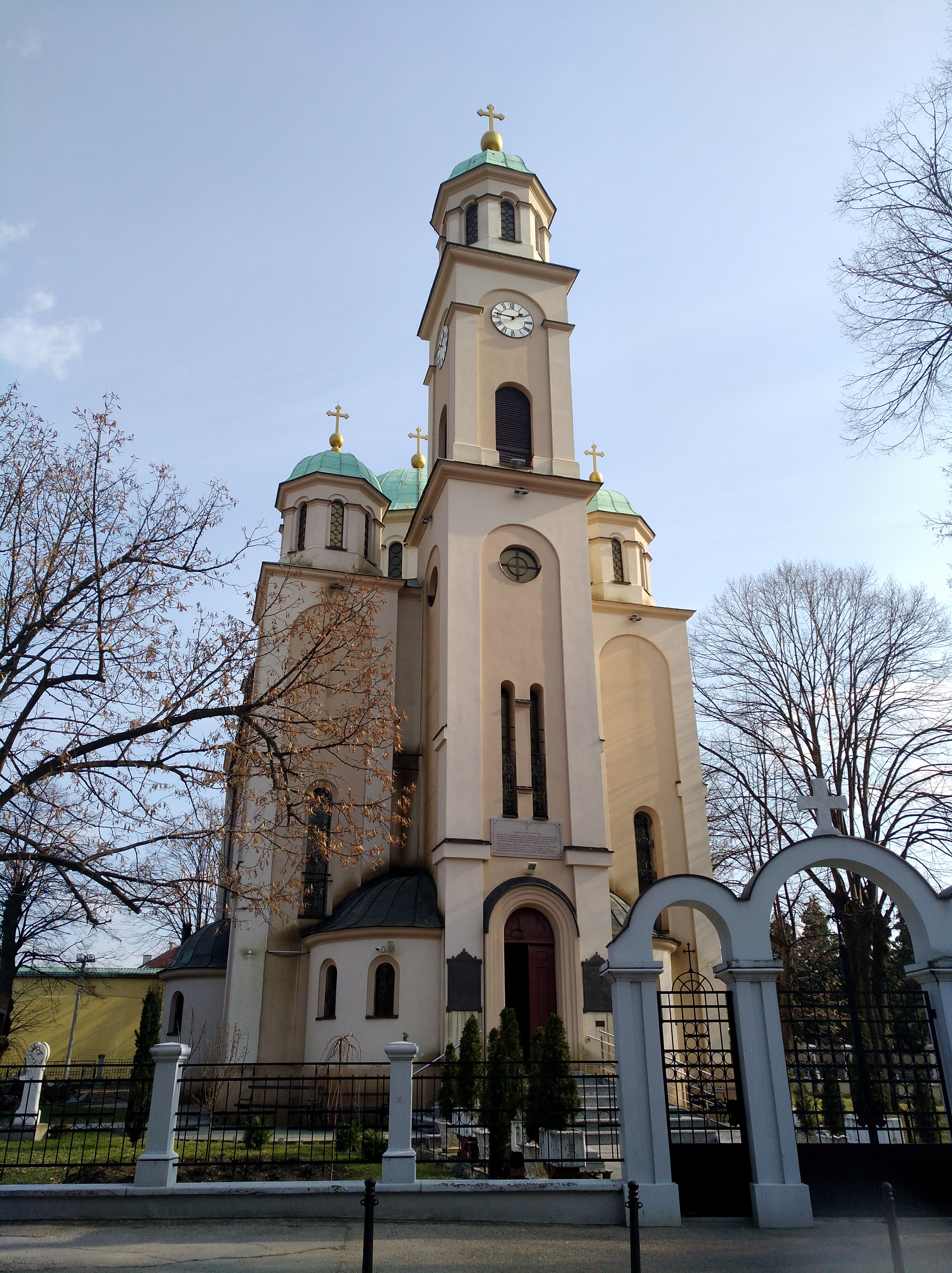
- Cathedral of the Dormition of the Theotokos, Tuzla

Location
- Territory: northeastern Bosnia and Herzegovina
- Headquarters: Bijeljina, Bosnia and Herzegovina

Information
- Denomination: Eastern Orthodox
- Sui iuris church: Serbian Orthodox Church
- Established: 1532
- Cathedral: Cathedral of the Dormition of the Theotokos, Tuzla; Co-cathedral of Nativity of the Theotokos, Bijeljina; Co-cathedral of Nativity of the Theotokos, Zvornik
- Language: Church Slavonic, Serbian

Current leadership
- Bishop: Fotije Sladojević

Map

Website
- Eparchy of Zvornik and Tuzla

The Eparchy of Zvornik and Tuzla (Serbian: Епархија зворничко-тузланска, romanized: Eparhija zvorničko-tuzlanska) is a diocese (eparchy) of the Serbian Orthodox Church covering northeastern Bosnia and Herzegovina.

The episcopal see is shared between the Cathedral of the Dormition of the Theotokos in Tuzla, Co-cathedral of Nativity of the Theotokos in Bijeljina, and Co-cathedral of the Nativity of the Theotokos in Zvornik. Its headquarters and bishop's residence are in Bijeljina.

== History ==
There are several archeological localities in the northeastern Bosnia and Herzegovina that indicate the presence of early Christianity during late Roman period and early Middle Ages. Since 1284, the region came under the rule of Serbian king Stefan Dragutin and soon after that an Eastern Orthodox Bishop Vasilije was appointed for all Bosnian regions, west of the river Drina. During the reign of Serbian Despots Stefan Lazarević (1389–1427) and Đurađ Branković (1427–1456), much of the northeastern Bosnia was again under Serbian rule. During that time, the foundation was laid for the establishment of an Eastern Orthodox eparchy in the region, under the jurisdiction of the Serbian Patriarchate of Peć.

By the end of 15th century much of the region was conquered by Ottomans who organized the territory into a province called the Sanjak of Zvornik. Between 1526 and 1541, during the attempt of Metropolitan Pavle of Smederevo to restore the Serbian Patriarchate of Peć, Eparchy of Zvornik and its bishop Teofan were also included in local ecclesiastical disputes with Archbishopric of Ohrid. Finally in 1557, Serbian Patriarchate of Peć was restored and the Eparchy of Zvornik was returned to its jurisdiction, with bishops of Zvornik holding the honorary title of metropolitan.

In 1766, when Serbian Patriarchate of Peć was abolished, the Eparchy of Zvornik and all other Serbian eparchies under Ottoman rule came under the jurisdiction of Ecumenical Patriarchate of Constantinople. Bishop of Zvornik kept his honorary title of Metropolitan, as was also the custom in the Ecumenical Patriarchate. By the end of 18th century and during much of 19th century, bishops of this Eparchy resided in the city of Tuzla. Since 1878, territory of Bosnia and Herzegovina was under the occupation of Austria-Hungary, but under the Church Convention of 1880 all Eastern Orthodox eparchies remained under supreme ecclesiastical jurisdiction of Ecumenical Patriarchate of Constantinople. After World War I and the creation of the Kingdom of Yugoslavia, a council of Eastern Orthodox bishops in Bosnia and Herzegovina unanimously decided to unite with other Serbian ecclesiastical provinces to form the unified Serbian Orthodox Church, a process completed in 1920.

== List of bishops ==
- Teofan (1532–1541)
- Pavle (1561–1576)
- Georgije (end of 16th century)
- Teodisije (1601–1602)
- Gavrilo (died 1627)
- Konstantin (around 1629)
- Luka (17th century)
- Venijamin (17th century)
- Isaija (17th century)
- Ananija (around 1674)
- Gerasim (18th century)
- Grigorije (1767–1773)
- Gerasim (1776–1804)
- Joanikije (1804–1807)
- Evgenije (1807–1808)
- Gavrilo (1808–1837)
- Kiril (1837–1848)
- Agatangel (1848–1858)
- Dionisije I (1861–1865)
- Dionisije II (1865–1891)
- Nikolaj Mandić (1892–1897)
- Grigorije Živković (1897–1909)
- Ilarion Radonić (1910–1921)
- Nektarije Krulj (1929–1955)
- Longin Tomić (1955–1977)
- Vasilije Kačavenda (1978–2013)
- Hrizostom Jević (2013–2017)
- Fotije Sladojević (2017–present)

== Notable monasteries ==
- Ozren
- Tavna
- Papraća
- Lomnica

== Gallery ==
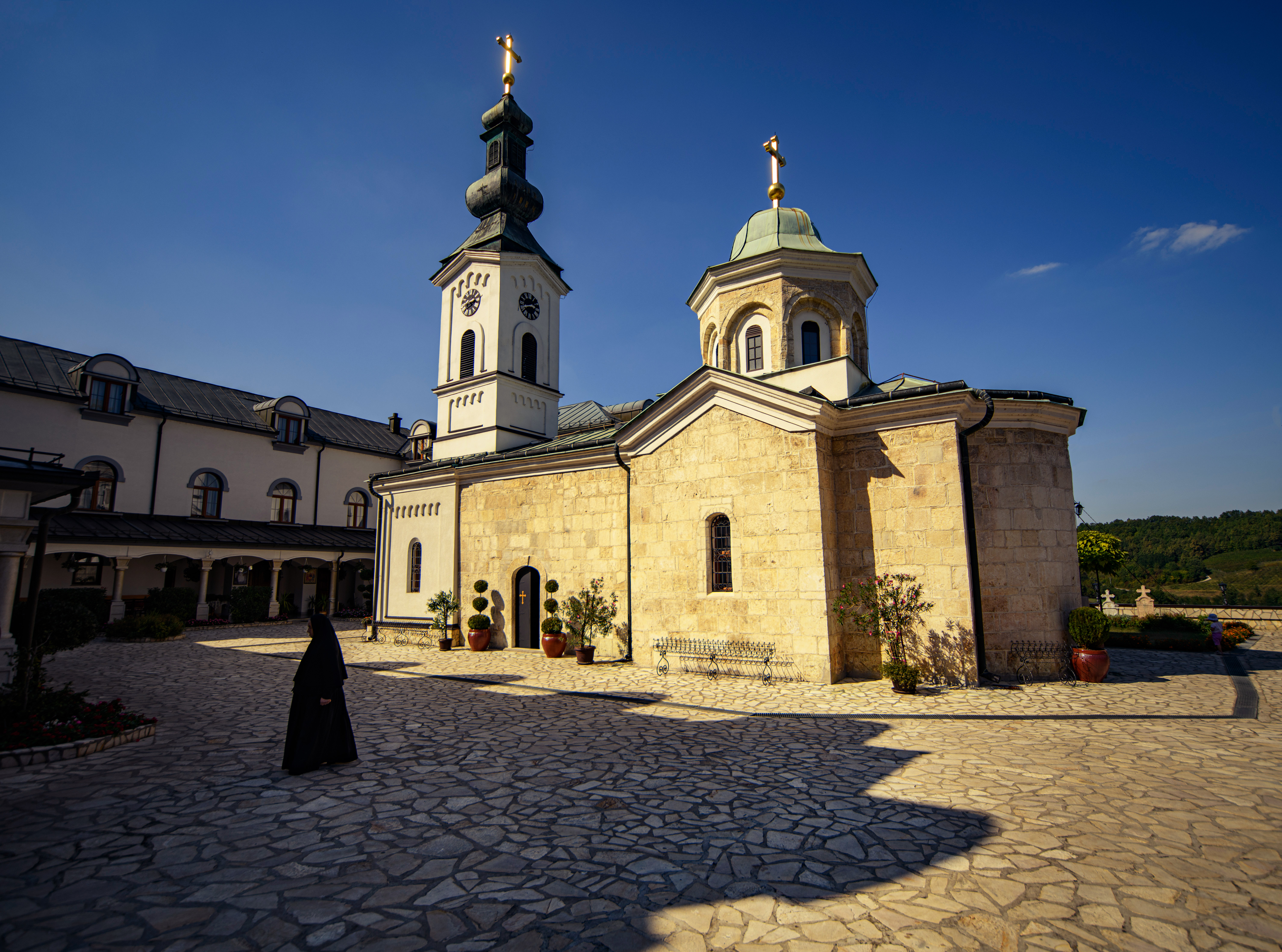
Tavna Monastery

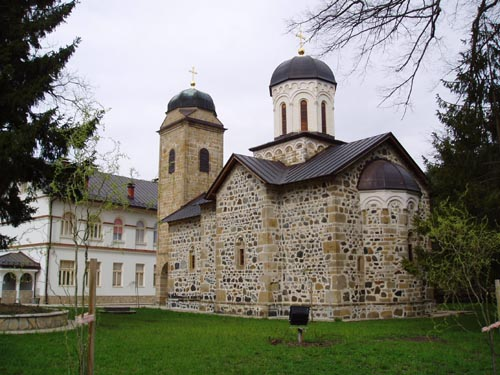
Ozren Monastery

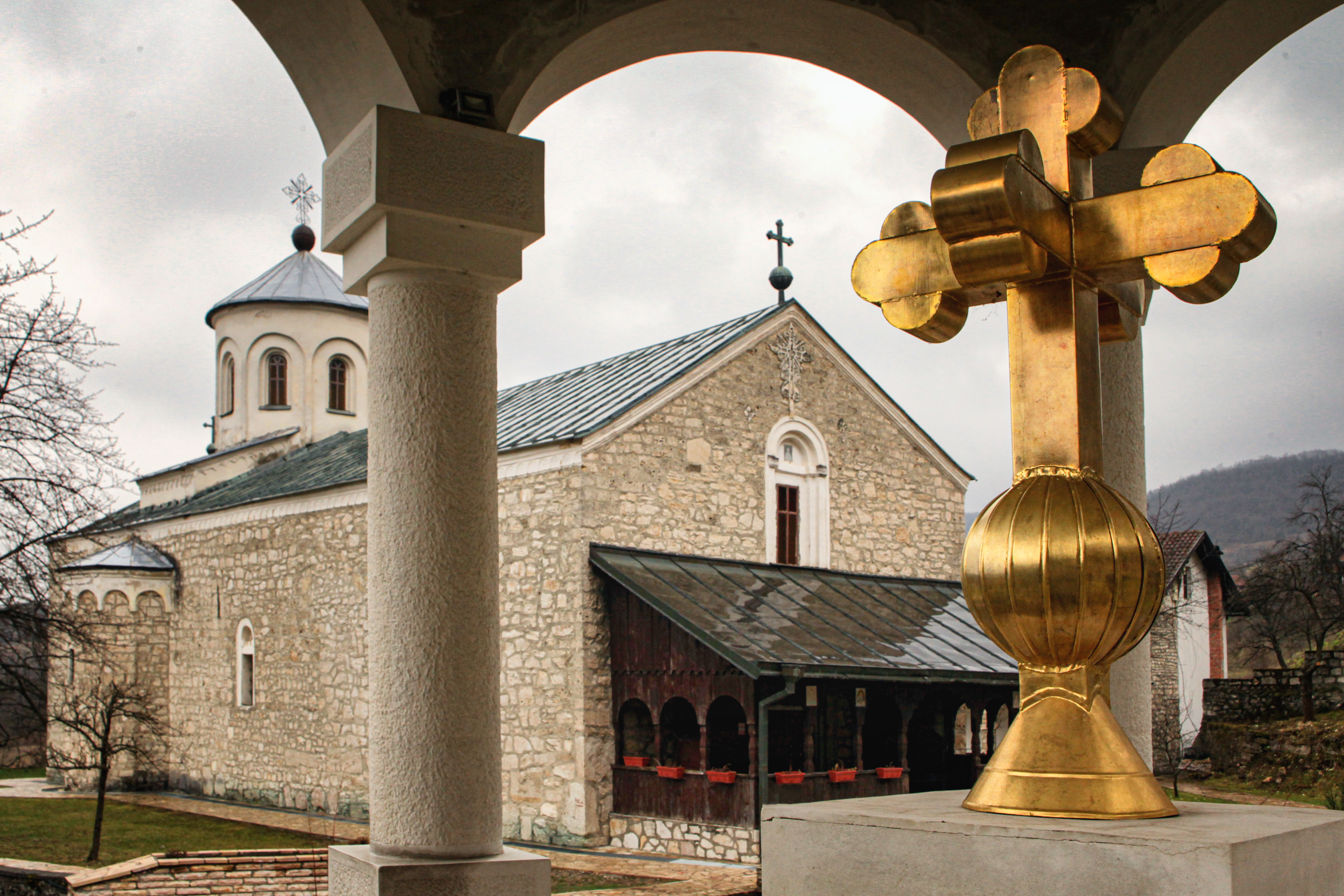
Papraća Monastery

== See also ==
- Eastern Orthodoxy in Bosnia and Herzegovina
- Eparchies and metropolitanates of the Serbian Orthodox Church
- Serbs of Bosnia and Herzegovina

== Bibliography ==
- Kašić, Dušan, ed. (1975). Serbian Orthodox Church: Its past and present. Vol. 5. Belgrade: Serbian Orthodox Church.
- Нилевић, Борис (1990). Српска православна црква у Босни и Херцеговини до обнове Пећке патријаршије 1557. године (Serbian Orthodox Church in Bosnia and Herzegovina before the renewal of the Patriarchate of Peć in 1557). Сарајево: Веселин Маслеша. ISBN 9788621004270.
- Вуковић, Сава (1996). Српски јерарси од деветог до двадесетог века (Serbian Hierarchs from the 9th to the 20th Century). Евро, Унирекс, Каленић.
- Bataković, Dušan T. (1996). The Serbs of Bosnia & Herzegovina: History and Politics. Dialogue Association. ISBN 9782911527104.
- Mileusnić, Slobodan (1997). Spiritual Genocide: A survey of destroyed, damaged and desecrated churches, monasteries and other church buildings during the war 1991-1995 (1997). Belgrade: Museum of the Serbian Orthodox Church.
- Radić, Radmila (1998). "Serbian Orthodox Church and the War in Bosnia and Herzegovina". Religion and the War in Bosnia. Atlanta: Scholars Press. pp. 160–182. ISBN 9780788504280.
- Ćirković, Sima (2004). The Serbs. Malden: Blackwell Publishing. ISBN 9781405142915.
- Kiminas, Demetrius (2009). The Ecumenical Patriarchate: A History of Its Metropolitanates with Annotated Hierarch Catalogs. Wildside Press LLC. ISBN 9781434458766.
- Sotirović, Vladislav B. (2011). "The Serbian Patriarchate of Peć in the Ottoman Empire: The First Phase (1557–94)". Serbian Studies: Journal of the North American Society for Serbian Studies. 25 (2): 143–169. doi:10.1353/ser.2011.0038. S2CID 143629322.
