= Mostar (magazine) =

- Editor: Ibrahim Baran
- Categories: Culture and actuality
- Frequency: Monthly
- First issue: March 2005
- Company: Mostar Basın Yayın Dağıtım ve Organizasyon San. Tic. Ltd. Şti.
- Country: Turkey (Origin)
- Based in: Istanbul
- Language: Turkish
- Website: www.mostar.com.tr
- ISSN: 1305-4686

Mostar is a monthly magazine focusing on culture and current affairs. It was first published in March 2005. Its name originated from the Stari Most in Bosnia-Herzegovina.

== Content of Magazine ==
- Treatise on government (Siyasetname)
- History
- Books
- Economy
- Travelling
- Health
- Interview
- Cinema
- Agenda
- World
- Turkey
- Main step
- Biography
- Media
- Thinking
- Society
- Agenda of literature
- Culture
- Literature
- Culture and Arts
- Technology

== File subjects ==
Magazıne Number	Date of Publication	Main topic name
83	January 2012	Küreselleşme: Bir çıkış yolu arayışı
84	February 2012	“İslam düşüncesi” neyin ifadesi?
85	March 2012	Göz, Gez, Arpacık ve İran
86	April 2012	İlkçağlardan bugüne inanç ve mekân ilişkisi

== Awards ==
- On January 1, 2010, Mostar has been awarded as "Magazine of the Year" by Writers Union of Turkey.
- On April 12, 2012, Mostar has won the reward of "Magazine of the Year" from International Association of Islamic World Journalist and Authors (ULGAYAD)
