= Bishop of Banja Luka =

Bishop of Banja Luka may refer to:

- Serbian Orthodox Bishop of Banja Luka, bishop of the Eparchy of Banja Luka
- Roman Catholic Bishop of Banja Luka, bishop of the Diocese of Banja Luka
