= Nikolaj Mandić =

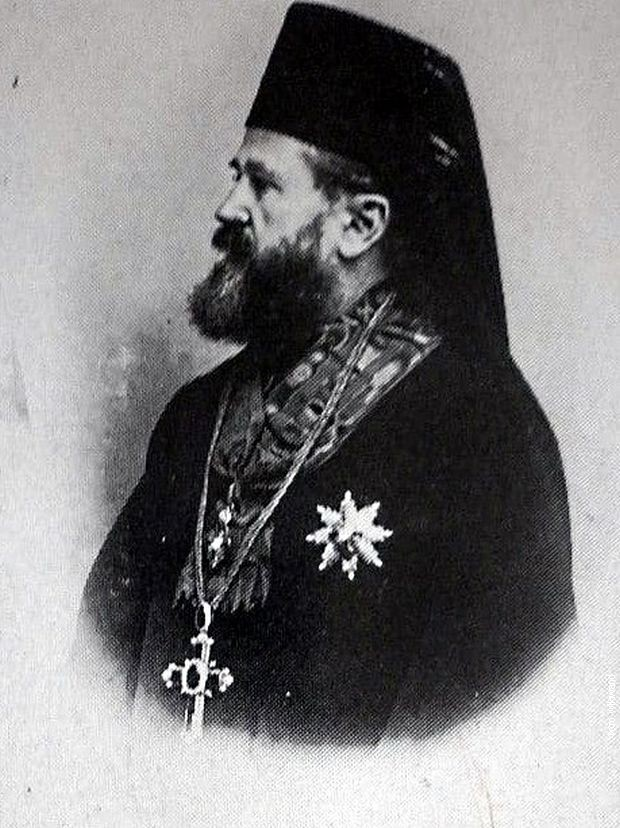
Nikolaj Mandić

Nikolaj Mandić (Serbian: Николај Мандић, born Serbian: Петар Мандић, romanized: Petar Mandić; Gračac, Austrian Empire, 5 August 1840 – Opatija, Austrian Empire, 2 August 1907) was a Serbian Orthodox theologian, Metropolitan of the Metropolitanate of Dabar and Bosnia (1896–1907) and Metropolitan of the Diocese of Zvornik-Tuzla from 1892 to 1896 (now Eparchy of Zvornik and Tuzla).

== Biography ==
Petar Mandić was born in Upper Gračac to parents Nikola Mandić and Soka (née Budisavljević) Mandić, brother of Georgina Đuka (Mandić) Tesla and Toma Mandić. The great Serbian-American inventor Nikola Tesla was his nephew.

Petar Mandić was a Serbian Orthodox priest who after his wife died was tonsured as a monk in the Gomirje Monastery, where he adopted the monastic name of Nikolaj, served as head of the monastery brotherhood (archimandrite), and became the head of Metropolitanate of Dabar and Bosnia of the Serbian Orthodox Church in 1896 as Vladika Nikolaj (Mandić). Later, he served as Metropolitan of Dabar and Bosnia from 7 November 1896 to 2 August 1907. Nikola Tesla visited his uncle at the Monastery of Gomirje.

Bishop Nikolaj (Petar Mandić) was left with no heirs, but he turned all his attention and love towards Nikola Tesla, his nephew, after the tragedy that befell his own family. Bishop Nikolay (Mandić ensured that after the death of Milutin Tesla (Nikola Tesla's father) in 1879, Nikola Tesla's education was paid for and that he had everything he needed to succeed in life. His two wealthy brothers—Pajo and Trifun Mandić—also assisted their talented young nephew with his higher education and subsequent emigration from Paris to the United States, where he lived and worked for the rest of his life.

Bishop Nikolaj, during the administration of the Zvornik-Tuzla Diocese (1892–1896) and later, during the reign of the Dabar-Bosna Diocese, was considered to be the leader of the so-called pro-government faction of the Serb clergy and is remembered as such.
