= Vođenica =

Vođenica Вођеница
- Village
- Location within Bosnia and Herzegovina
- Coordinates: 44°38′N 16°16′E
- Country: Bosnia and Herzegovina
- Entity: Federation of Bosnia and Herzegovina
- Canton: Una-Sana
- Municipality: Bosanski Petrovac

Area
  - Total: 17.37 sq mi (45.00 km^{2})

Population (2013)
  - Total: 184
  - Density: 10.6/sq mi (4.09/km^{2})
- Time zone: UTC+1 (CET)
  - Summer (DST): UTC+2 (CEST)

Vođenica (Serbian Cyrillic: Вођеница) is a village in the municipality of Bosanski Petrovac, Bosnia and Herzegovina.

== Demographics ==
According to the 2013 census, its population was 184.

Ethnicity in 2013
Ethnicity	Number	Percentage
Serbs	178	96.7%
Croats	3	1.6%
other/undeclared	3	1.6%
Total	184	100%

== Notable individuals ==
- Hrizostom Jević
