= Cathedral of the Dormition of the Theotokos, Tuzla =

Serbian Orthodox cathedral in Tuzla, Bosnia and Herzegovina

Cathedral of the Dormition of the Theotokos
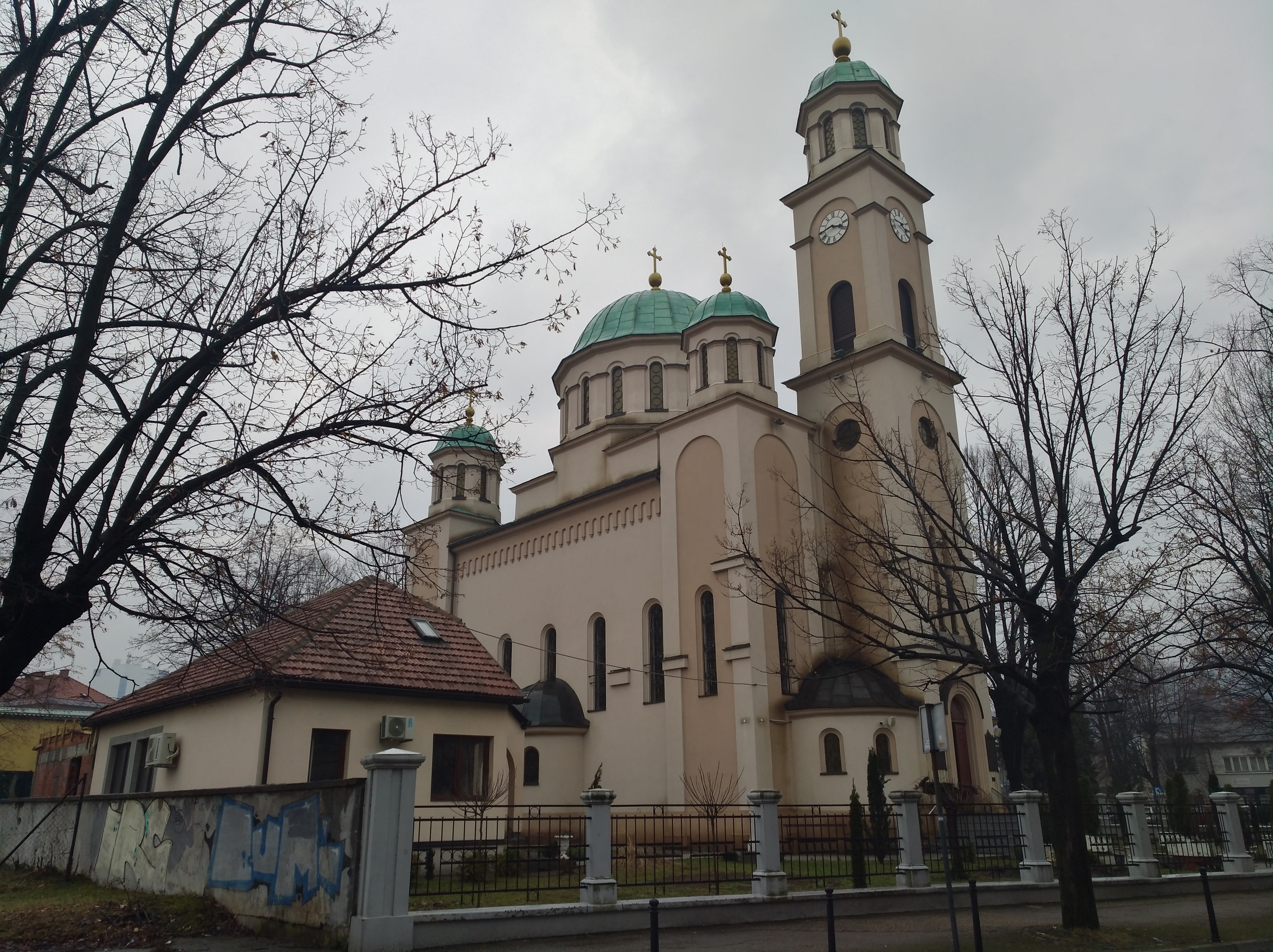
- Cathedral of the Dormition of the Theotokos, pictured in 2019
- Cathedral of the Dormition of the Theotokos
- 44°32′16″N 18°40′48″E
- Location: Tuzla
- Country: Bosnia and Herzegovina
- Denomination: Serbian Orthodox Church

History
- Status: Church
- Dedication: Dormition of the Theotokos

Architecture
- Functional status: Active
- Years built: 1882

Administration
- Archdiocese: Eparchy of Zvornik and Tuzla

The Cathedral of the Dormition of the Theotokos (Serbian: Саборна црква Успења Пресвете Богородице, romanized: Saborna crkva Uspenja Presvete Bogorodice) is an Eastern Orthodox church located in Tuzla, Bosnia and Herzegovina. It is under jurisdiction of the Eparchy of Zvornik and Tuzla of the Serbian Orthodox Church and serves as its cathedral church.

Serbian Orthodox community in Tuzla began raising funds for the construction of a new church in 1860 and by 1868, they had collected around four thousand ducats. The foundation of the new church was consecrated on May 6, 1874, in a consecration ceremony attended by local officials of the Ottoman Bosnia and Herzegovina.

The construction of the church was delayed by political and military events, including the Serbian-Ottoman War in 1876. After the Austro-Hungarian occupation of Bosnia in 1878 construction was resumed under military supervision. Emperor Franz Joseph I of Austria contributed 600 florins to the project. The church was completed on August 27, 1882, and was consecrated by Metropolitan Dionisije Ilić.

The church underwent several renovations, the first in 1909–1910, when the Gothic bell tower was replaced. Further renovations occurred in 1925, 1968, and during the 1990s. In 2007, the Commission for the Preservation of National Monuments declared the church and some of its movable properties a national monument of Bosnia and Herzegovina.
