= Petar Zimonjić =

Serbian Orthodox metropolitan bishop and saint (1866–1941)

Saint Metropolitan Petar of Dabar and Bosnia
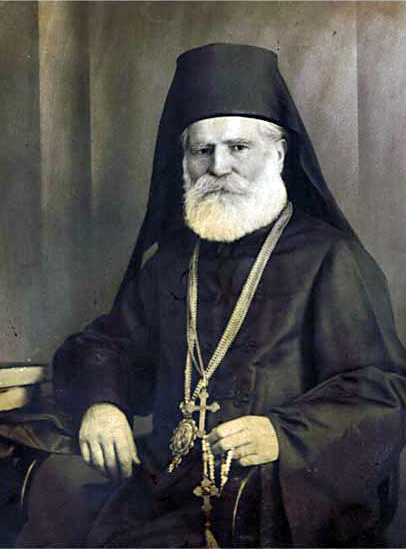

Holy hieromartyr
- Born: Jovan Zimonjić; 24 June 1866; Grahovo, Nikšić, Montenegro
- Died: June 1941 (aged 74–75); Jasenovac concentration camp, Independent State of Croatia
- Venerated in: Eastern Orthodox Church
- Canonized: 1998, Belgrade by Serbian Orthodox Church
- Feast: 17 September (O.S. 4 October)
- Attributes: Vested as a bishop

Petar Zimonjić (Serbian Cyrillic: Петар Зимоњић; 24 June 1866 – June 1941) was a bishop of the Serbian Orthodox Church serving as the metropolitan of Dabar and Bosnia in the Kingdom of Yugoslavia from 1920 until the beginning of World War II.

He was killed by Ustaše of the Nazi Germany-aligned Independent State of Croatia in June 1941. The Serbian Orthodox Church venerates him as a Saint.

== Life ==
The future Metropolitan Petar was the son of a nobleman (vojvoda) and priest Bogdan Zimonjić from the region of Herzegovina. He was born in Grahovo on 24 June 1866. He attended the seminary in Reljevo (in neighboring Sarajevo) between 1883 and 1887 and continued his education at the Orthodox Theological Faculty in Cernovice from 1887 until his graduation in 1893. In October 1893, Petar was appointed assistant professor at the Reljevo Seminary, and a year later he was appointed professor.

He received the name Petar when he took monastic vows on 6 September 1895. He was ordained deacon on 7 September and presbyter the following day. He became a consistorial advisor in Sarajevo in 1901. He was then elected the Bishop of the Eparchy of Zachlumia, Herzegovina, and the Littoral and then on 9 June 1903, Petar was consecrated and enthroned in Mostar. After the retirement of the Metropolitan of Dabar and Bosnia Evgenije (Letica), Petar was appointed Metropolitan of the diocese by a royal charter dated 7 November 1920.

== Martyrdom ==
After World War II had broken out, Metropolitan Petar was advised to leave Bosnia and move to Serbia or Montenegro. He replied saying: “I am the people's shepherd, which means that I am bound to stay here and share evil with these people, as I used to share well with them; thus I have to share the destiny of my people and stay where I am supposed to be". He defended consistently the Orthodox faith in front of German Gestapo by insisting on continuing use of the Serbian Cyrillic alphabet instead of changing to the Latin alphabet. Božidar Bralo, a Roman Catholic priest and an adherent of the Croatian nationalist Ustaše movememnt that was in charge of Bosnia and Herzegovina, had a decisive role in this severe policy of forbidding the use of Cyrillic, including the arrest of Metropolitan Petar.

Metropolitan Petar was arrested on 12 May 1941. He was imprisoned first in the Beledija prison, and then three days later he was transported to the Kerestinec camp where he was assigned the number 29781. There, his beard and hair were shaved and all his bishop's insignia were taken away from him. The circumstances of his death are inconsistent. After enduring severe torture, he was moved to Koprivnica and then to either Jasenovac or Gospić concentration camp. According to the testimonies of Jovo Furtula and Jovo Lubura from the Sarajevo District, Metropolitan Petar was killed in the Jasenovac concentration camp. His corpse was then thrown to the fiery furnace used for brick making. However, another version states that Metropolitan Petar was taken to the Jadovno concentration camp, where he was killed in a monstrous manner and his remains were thrown to an acid pit.

In 1998, during the regular session of the Holy Synod of the Serbian Orthodox Church Metropolitan Petar was canonized and his name was added to the list of other saints of the Serbian people and of Orthodox Christian faith. The Serbian Church marks the memory of him in the third week of September.

== See also ==
- List of Serbian saints
