= Eastern Orthodoxy in Bosnia and Herzegovina =

Presence of Eastern Orthodox Christianity in Bosnia and Herzegovina

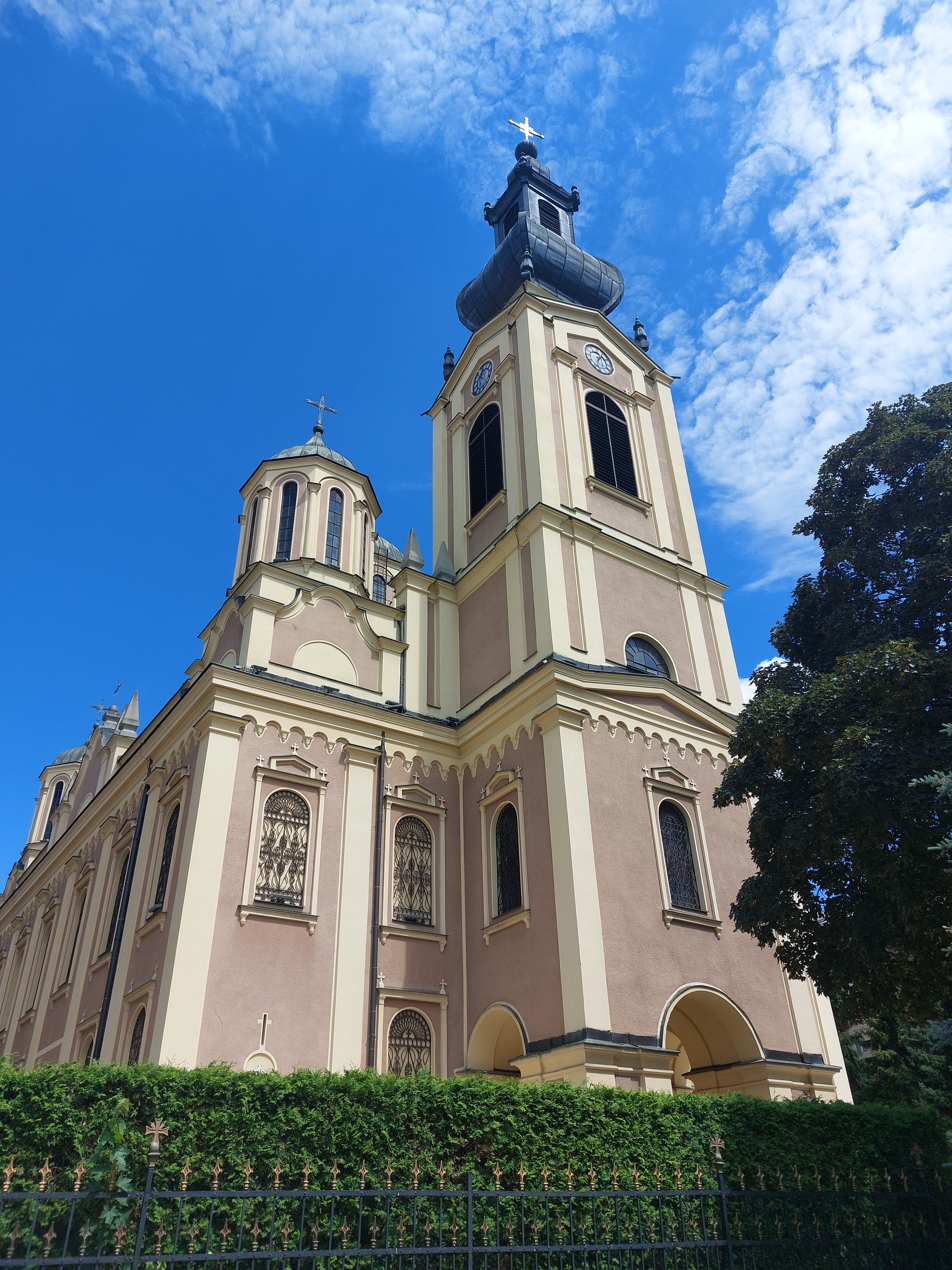
Cathedral of the Nativity of the Theotokos in Sarajevo

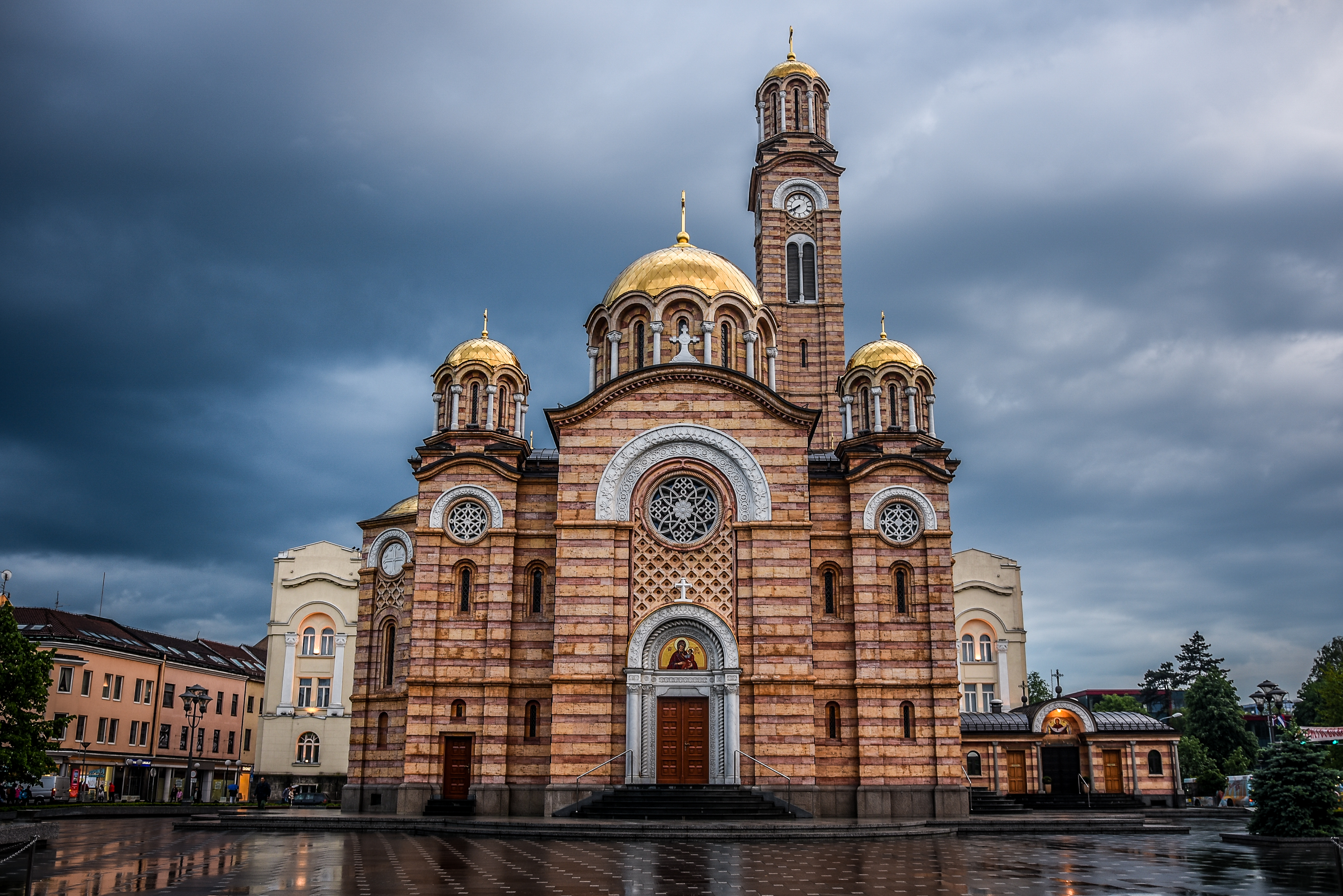
Cathedral of Christ the Saviour in Banja Luka

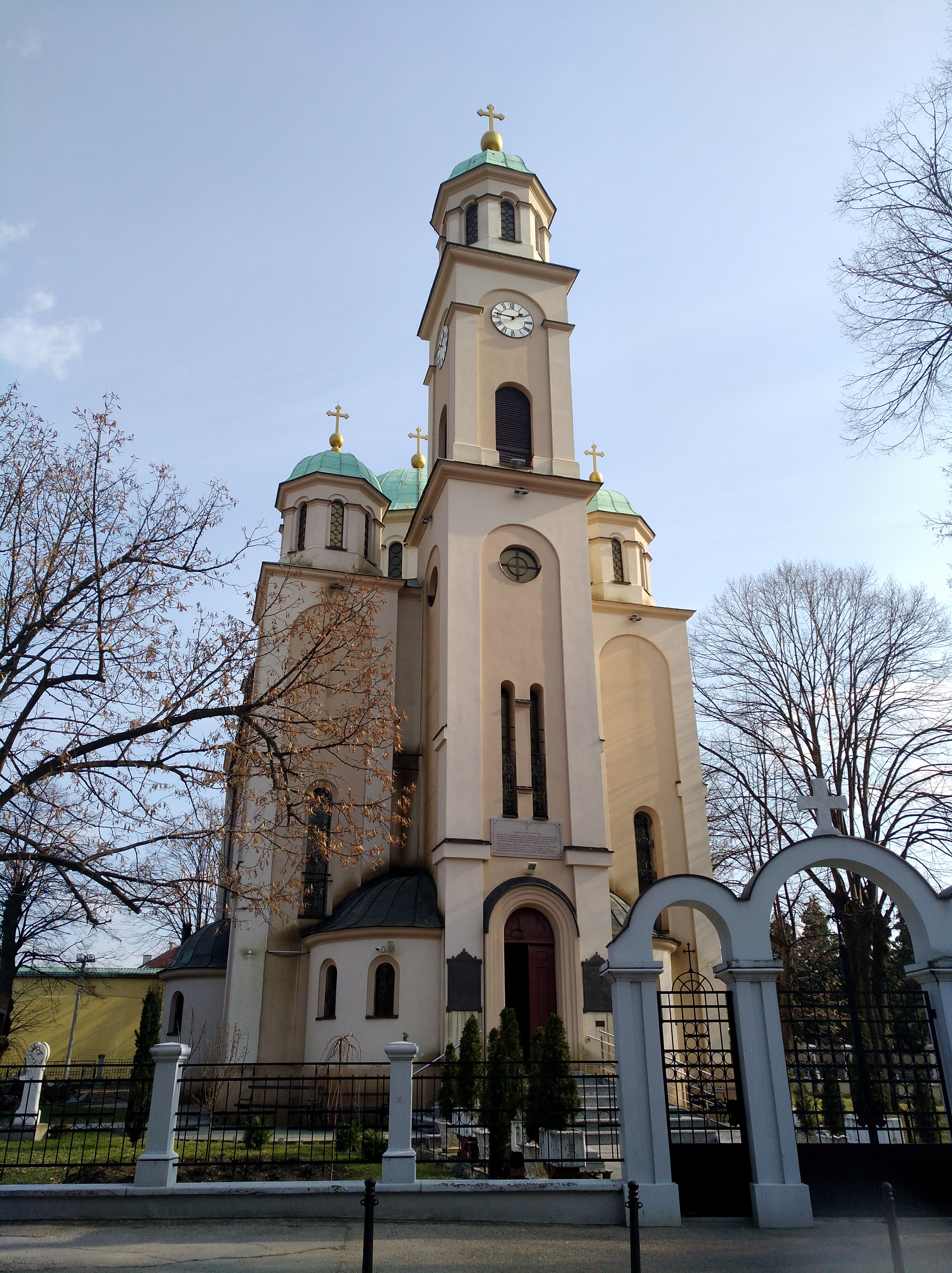
Cathedral of the Dormition of the Theotokos in Tuzla

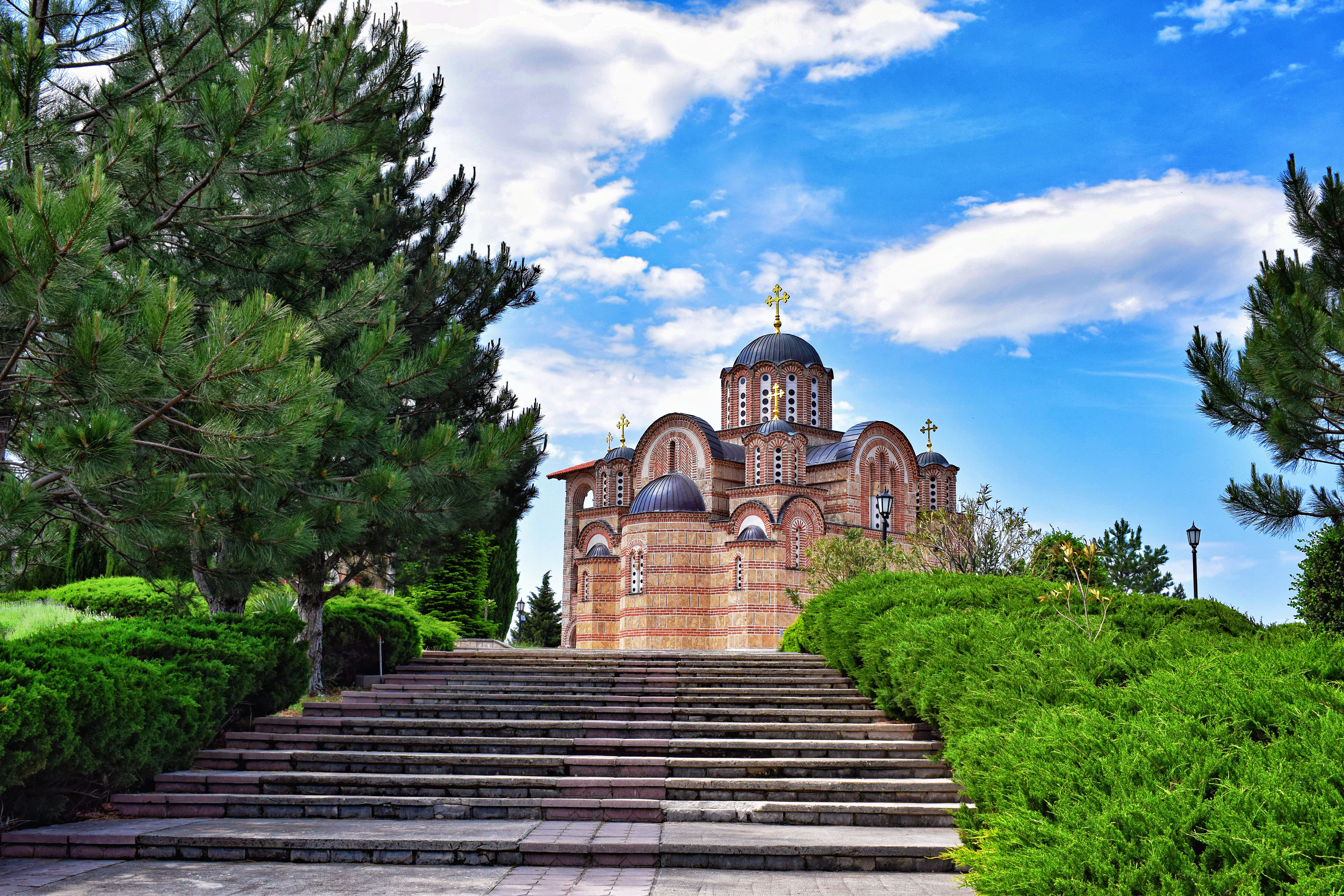
Hercegovačka Gračanica Monastery in Trebinje

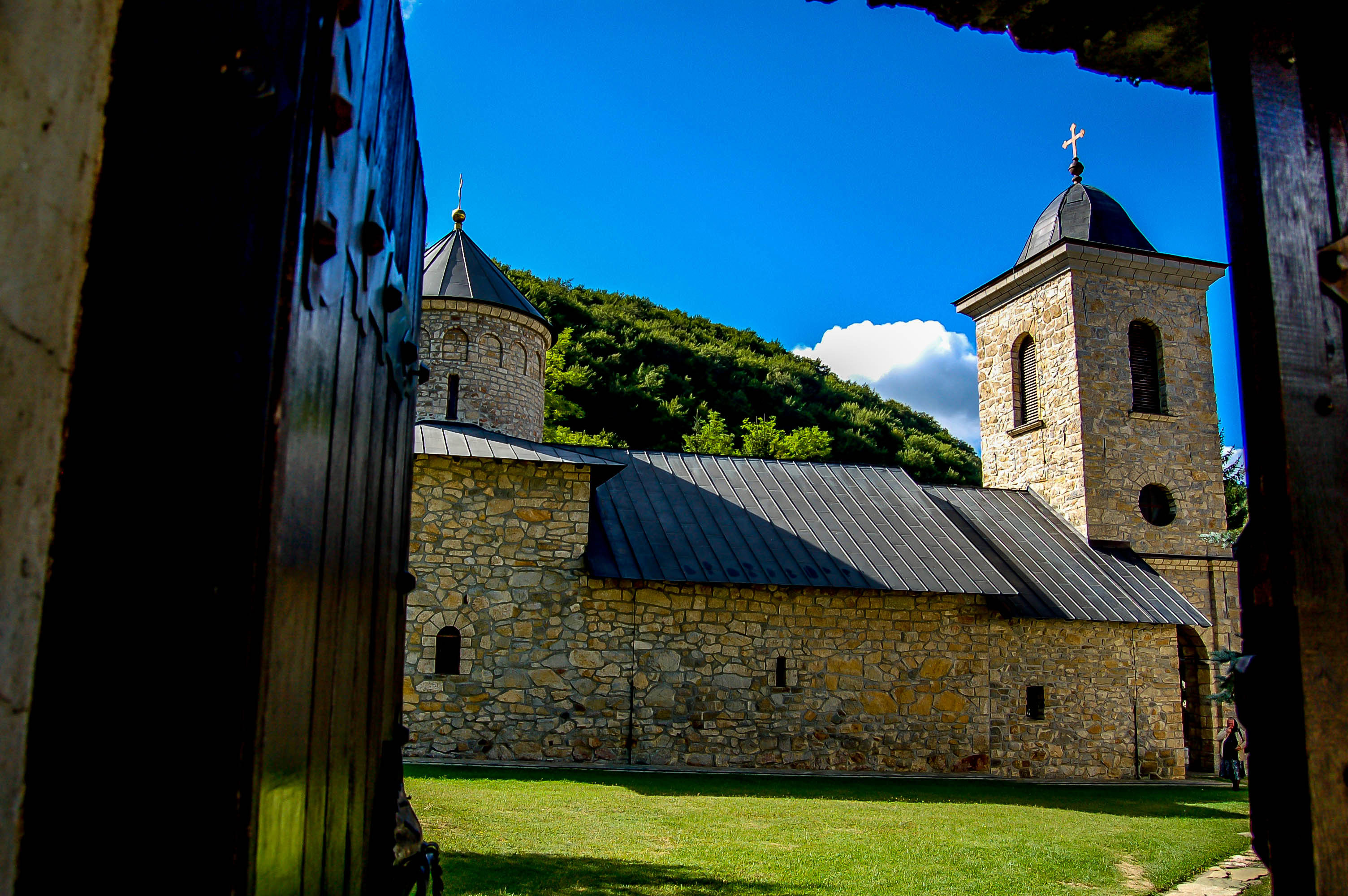
Gomionica Monastery near Banja Luka

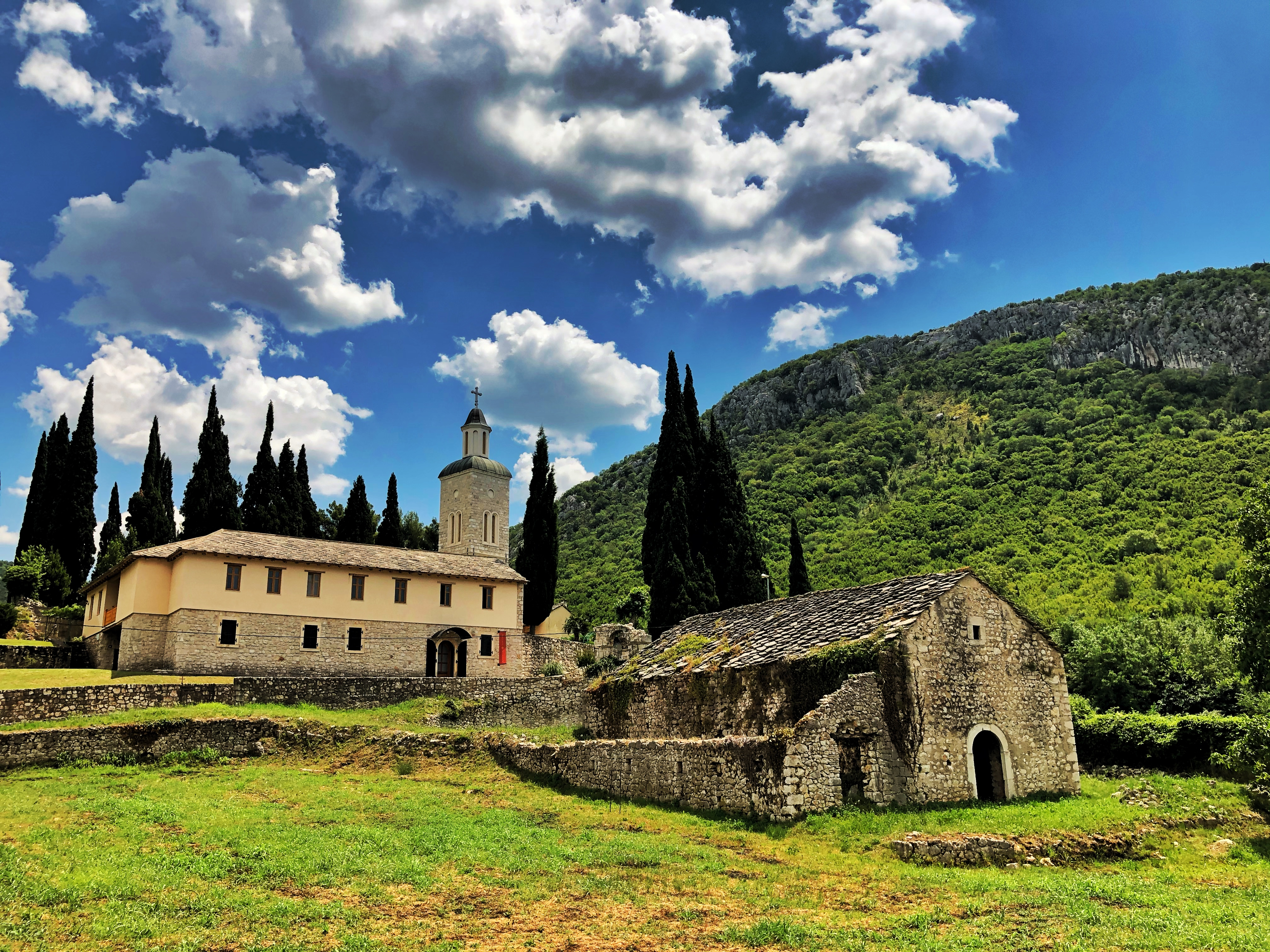
Žitomislić Monastery near Mostar

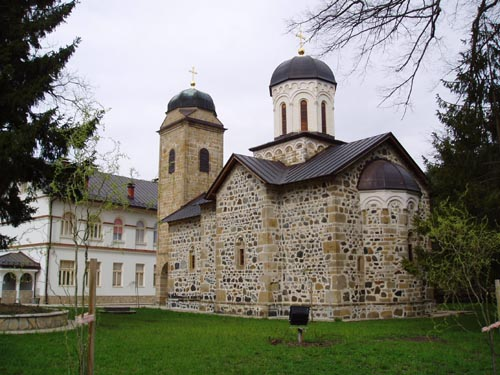
Ozren Monastery near Zavidovići

The Eastern Orthodoxy is the most widespread Christian denomination in Bosnia and Herzegovina and the second-largest religious group in the country, following Islam. According to the 2013 census, there were 1,089,658 adherents of Eastern Orthodoxy in Bosnia and Herzegovina, making up 30.7% of the population.

The Serbian Orthodox Church is the sole canonical Eastern Orthodox jurisdiction in the territory of Bosnia and Herzegovina.

== History ==
The end of the High Middle Ages saw Eastern Orthodoxy firmly establish itself in eastern Herzegovina, namely Zachlumia, following a period of rule by the Kingdom of Serbia. Zachlumia was conquered by Bosnian ban Stephen II Kotromanić in the late 1320s and was henceforth part of the Banate of Bosnia (later kingdom), in which the Roman Catholic Church and the indigenous Bosnian Church vied for supremacy. In this political climate, the Eastern Orthodoxy never seems to have penetrated the medieval Bosnia proper beyond Podrinje.

The Ottoman conquest of the Kingdom of Bosnia in 1463 led to drastic changes in the confessional structure of Bosnia and Herzegovina, with Islam taking root and Orthodox Christianity spreading into Bosnia. Sultan Mehmed the Conqueror vowed to protect Orthodox Christianity and, like all Orthodox churches, the Serbian Orthodox Church enjoyed tremendous support from the Ottoman state. The Ottomans introduced a sizeable Orthodox Christian population into Bosnia proper. The conversion of the adherents of the Bosnian Church also aided the spread of Eastern Orthodoxy. Later, areas abandoned by Catholics during the Ottoman–Habsburg wars were settled with Muslims and Orthodox Christians. The Ottoman regime consistently favored the Orthodoxy over the Catholicism and encouraged conversions of Catholics to Orthodoxy due to political expediency: while the entire Orthodox hierarchy was subjected to the sultan, the Catholics were suspected of conspiring with their brethren outside the Ottoman Empire.

While Bosnian Catholics were only allowed to repair existing sacral objects, a large-scale construction of Orthodox monasteries and churches throughout Bosnia started in the northwest in 1515. An Orthodox priest was present in Sarajevo already in 1489, and the city's first Orthodox church was constructed between 1520 and 1539. By 1532, Orthodox Christians had their own metropolitan bishop, who took up official residence in Sarajevo in 1699. By the end of the 18th century, the Metropolitan of Dabar and Bosnia had authority over the Orthodox bishops of Mostar, Zvornik, and Sarajevo. Even the high-ranking Orthodox clergymen, however, were very poorly educated and corrupt; they were reportedly ignorant of the basic principles of the faith, such as the Ten Commandments, confession, prayers and the importance of the cross. Syncretism was widespread among the Bosnians, with Catholics (as late as the 1880s) and Muslims celebrating the Orthodox slava.

The tide eventually turned against the church, however, when Orthodox clergy renounced loyalty to the sultans and started encouraging and aiding peasant rebellions. The Ottomans abolished the Serbian Patriarchate of Peć and, from the late 1760s until 1880, the Orthodox Christians in Bosnia and Herzegovina were directly under jurisdiction of the Ecumenical Patriarchate of Constantinople. As such it was led by Phanariotes, Greeks from Istanbul. In the mid-19th century, there were more than 400 Orthodox priests in Bosnia and Herzegovina; it was a time of renewed prosperity for the country's Eastern Orthodoxy. After World War I and the creation of the Kingdom of Yugoslavia, a council of Eastern Orthodox bishops in Bosnia and Herzegovina unanimously decided to unite with other Serbian ecclesiastical provinces to form the unified Serbian Orthodox Church, a process completed in 1920.

== Demographics ==
The published data from the 2013 Census included a crosstab of ethnicity and religion, (Note: The census regarded "Orthodox", and "Serbian" as separate categories; 1,085,760 or 30.7% declared themselves as Orthodox, 3,898 or 0.11% as Serbian.) which showed that Eastern Orthodox believers were divided between the following ethnic groups:

- 1,073,272 Serbs (98.8%)
- 1,910 Bosnians (0.1%)
- 1,395 Montenegrins (0.1%)
- 1,182 Bosniaks (0.1%)
- 1,172 Croats (0.1%)
- 1,120 Ukrainians (0.1%)
- 5,709 others, undeclared or unknown (0.5%)

== Serbian Orthodox Church in Bosnia and Herzegovina ==
The Serbian Orthodox Church exercise its jurisdiction in the territory of Bosnia and Herzegovina through the following dioceses:

- Metropolitanate of Dabar and Bosnia; seat in Sarajevo and the episcopal see at the Cathedral of the Nativity of the Theotokos.
- Eparchy of Banja Luka; seat in Banja Luka and the episcopal see at the Cathedral of Christ the Saviour.
- Eparchy of Bihać and Petrovac; seat in Bosanski Petrovac and the episcopal see at the Saints Peter and Paul Cathedral.
- Eparchy of Zachlumia, Herzegovina, and the Littoral; seat in Trebinje and the episcopal see at the Cathedral of the Transfiguration of the Lord.
- Eparchy of Zvornik and Tuzla; seat in Bijeljina and the episcopal see shared between the Cathedral of the Dormition of the Theotokos in Tuzla, Co-cathedral of Nativity of the Theotokos in Bijeljina, and Co-cathedral of the Nativity of the Theotokos in Zvornik.

== See also ==
- Religion in Bosnia and Herzegovina

== Bibliography ==
- Bataković, Dušan T. (1996). The Serbs of Bosnia & Herzegovina: History and Politics. Dialogue Association. ISBN 9782911527104.
- Ćirković, Sima (2004). The Serbs. Malden: Blackwell Publishing. ISBN 9781405142915.
- Ethnicity/National Affiliation, Religion and Mother Tongue (PDF). Sarajevo: Agency for Statistics of Bosnia and Herzegovina. 2019.
- Fine, John Van Antwerp Jr. (1991) [1983]. The Early Medieval Balkans: A Critical Survey from the Sixth to the Late Twelfth Century. Ann Arbor, Michigan: University of Michigan Press. ISBN 0-472-08149-7.
- Fine, John Van Antwerp Jr. (1994) [1987]. The Late Medieval Balkans: A Critical Survey from the Late Twelfth Century to the Ottoman Conquest. Ann Arbor, Michigan: University of Michigan Press. ISBN 0-472-08260-4.
- Kiminas, Demetrius (2009). The Ecumenical Patriarchate: A History of Its Metropolitanates with Annotated Hierarch Catalogs. Wildside Press LLC. ISBN 9781434458766.
- Mileusnić, Slobodan (1997). Spiritual Genocide: A survey of destroyed, damaged and desecrated churches, monasteries and other church buildings during the war 1991-1995 (1997). Belgrade: Museum of the Serbian Orthodox Church.
- Špoljarić, Luka (2019). "The Renaissance Papacy and Catholicization of the Manichean Heretics: Rethinking the 1459 Purge of the Bosnian Kingdom". Global Reformations: Transforming Early Modern Religions, Societies, and Cultures. London & New York: Routledge. pp. 153–175.
- Velikonja, Mitja (2003). Religious Separation and Political Intolerance in Bosnia-Herzegovina. College Station: Texas A&M University Press. ISBN 978-1-60344-724-9.
