= Metropolitanate of Dabar and Bosnia =

Diocese of the Serbian Orthodox Church

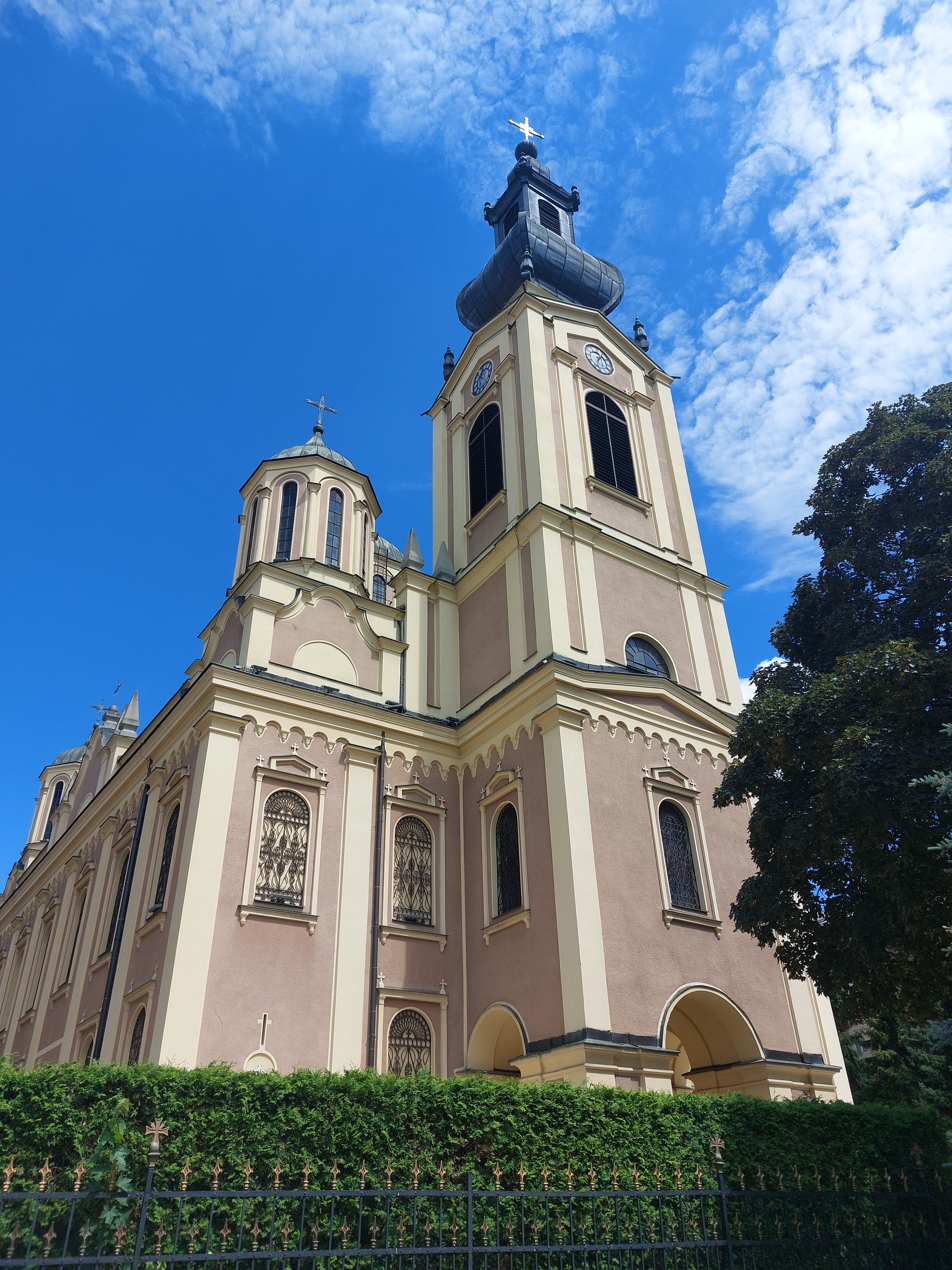
- Cathedral of the Nativity of the Theotokos, Sarajevo

Location
- Territory: central and central-eastern Bosnia and Herzegovina
- Headquarters: Sarajevo, Bosnia and Herzegovina

Information
- Denomination: Eastern Orthodox
- Sui iuris church: Serbian Orthodox Church
- Established: 1219
- Cathedral: Cathedral of the Nativity of the Theotokos, Sarajevo
- Language: Church Slavonic, Serbian

Current leadership
- Bishop: Hrizostom Jević

Map

Website
- Metropolitanate of Dabar and Bosnia

The Metropolitanate of Dabar and Bosnia (Note: Formerly unofficially known as the Metropolitanate of Sarajevo (Сарајевска митрополија).) (Serbian: Митрополија дабробосанска, romanized: Mitropolija dabrobosanska) is a metropolitan diocese of the Serbian Orthodox Church covering central and central-eastern regions of Bosnia and Herzegovina.

The episcopal see is located at the Cathedral of the Nativity of the Theotokos, Sarajevo. Its headquarters and bishop's residence are also in Sarajevo.

== History ==
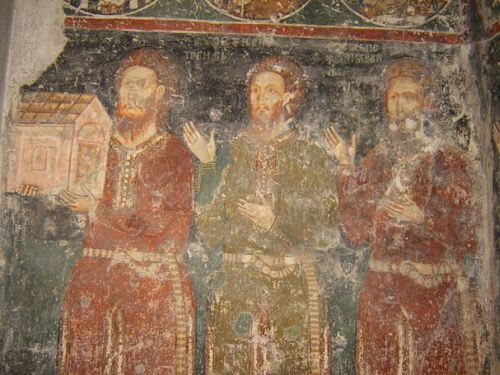
14th-century fresco of the founders of Dobrun Monastery

The medieval Eparchy of Dabar was founded in 1219 by the first Serbian archbishop, Saint Sava. The seat of bishops of Dabar was in the Banja Monastery near Priboj, Serbia. Eparchy of Dabar had jurisdiction over the region of lower Lim and middle Drina on the borders with medieval Bosnia.

In 1557, Serbian Patriarchate of Peć was restored and the Eparchy of Dabar and Bosnia was returned to its jurisdiction, with its bishops of holding the honorary title of metropolitan. In 1766, when the autocephalous Serbian Patriarchate of Peć was abolished, Eparchy of Dabar and Bosnia and all other Serbian eparchies under Ottoman rule came under the jurisdiction of Ecumenical Patriarchate of Constantinople. Bishop of Dabar and Bosnia kept his honorary title of metropolitan, as was also the custom in the Ecumenical Patriarchate. The seat of metropolitan was in Sarajevo.

Since the 1878 campaign, Bosnia and Herzegovina was ruled by Austria-Hungary, but under the Convention of 1880 all Eastern Orthodox eparchies remained under ecclesiastical jurisdiction of Ecumenical Patriarchate of Constantinople. After World War I and the creation of the Kingdom of Yugoslavia, a council of Eastern Orthodox bishops in Bosnia and Herzegovina unanimously decided to unite with other Serbian ecclesiastical provinces to form the unified Serbian Orthodox Church, a process completed in 1920.

== List of bishops ==
- Hristofor (1220)
- Joanikije (13th c.)
- Gavrilo (13th c.)
- Isaija (1286–1291)
- Jovan I (1293–1307)
- Metodije (1320 or 1322)
- Nikola (1329)
- Jovan II
- Spiridon
- Jovan III
- Velimir Vladimirović (1463)
- Jovan IV
- Josif
- Gavrilo Avramović (before 1578)
- Petronije (1578–1589)
- Aksentije (1589–1592)
- Teodor (1614)
- Makarije (1620)
- Isaija (1622–1656)
- Longin (1656 or 1656–1668)
- Melentije (1668)
- Hristofor (1668–1681))
- Atanasije Ljubojević (1681–1688)
- Visarion (1690–1708)
- Mojsije Petrović (1709–1713)
- Melentije Milenković (1713–1740)
- Gavrilo Mihailović (1741–1752)
- Pajsije Lazarević (1752–1759)
- Vasilije Jovanović Brkić (1760–1763)
- Dionisije (1763)
- Serafim (1753–1790)
- Danilo (c. 1769)
- Kirilo (1776–1779)
- Pajsije (1793–1802)
- Kalinik (1802–1816)
- Venijamin (1816–1835)
- Amvrosije (1835–1840)
- Ignjatije (1841–1851)
- Prokopije (1851–1856)
- Dionisije (1856–1860)
- Ignjatije II (1860–1868)
- Dionisije Ilijević (1868–1871)
- Pajsije (1872–1874)
- Antim (1874–1880)
- Sava Kosanović (1881–1885)
- Georgije Nikolajević (1885–1896)
- Nikolaj Mandić (1896–1907)
- Evgenije Letica (1908–1920)
- Petar Zimonjić (1920–1941)
- Nektarije Krulj (1951–1966)
- Vladislav Mitrović (1967–1992)
- Nikolaj Mrđa (1992–2015)
- Grigorije Durić (administrator) (2015–2017)
- Hrizostom Jević (2017–present)

== Notable monasteries ==
- Čajniče
- Vozuća
- Dobrun
- Sase

== Gallery ==
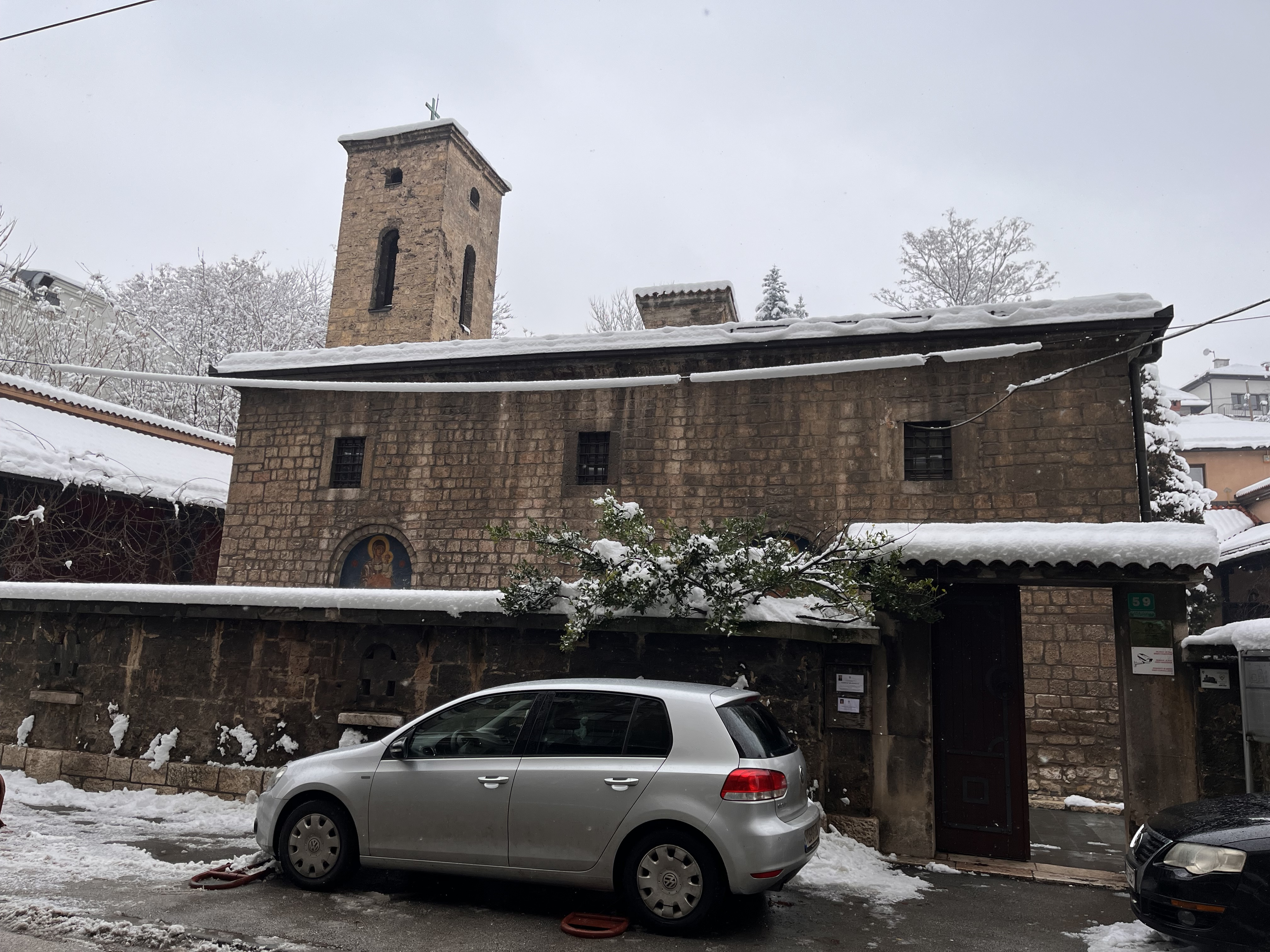
Church of the Holy Archangels Michael and Gabriel (in Sarajevo)

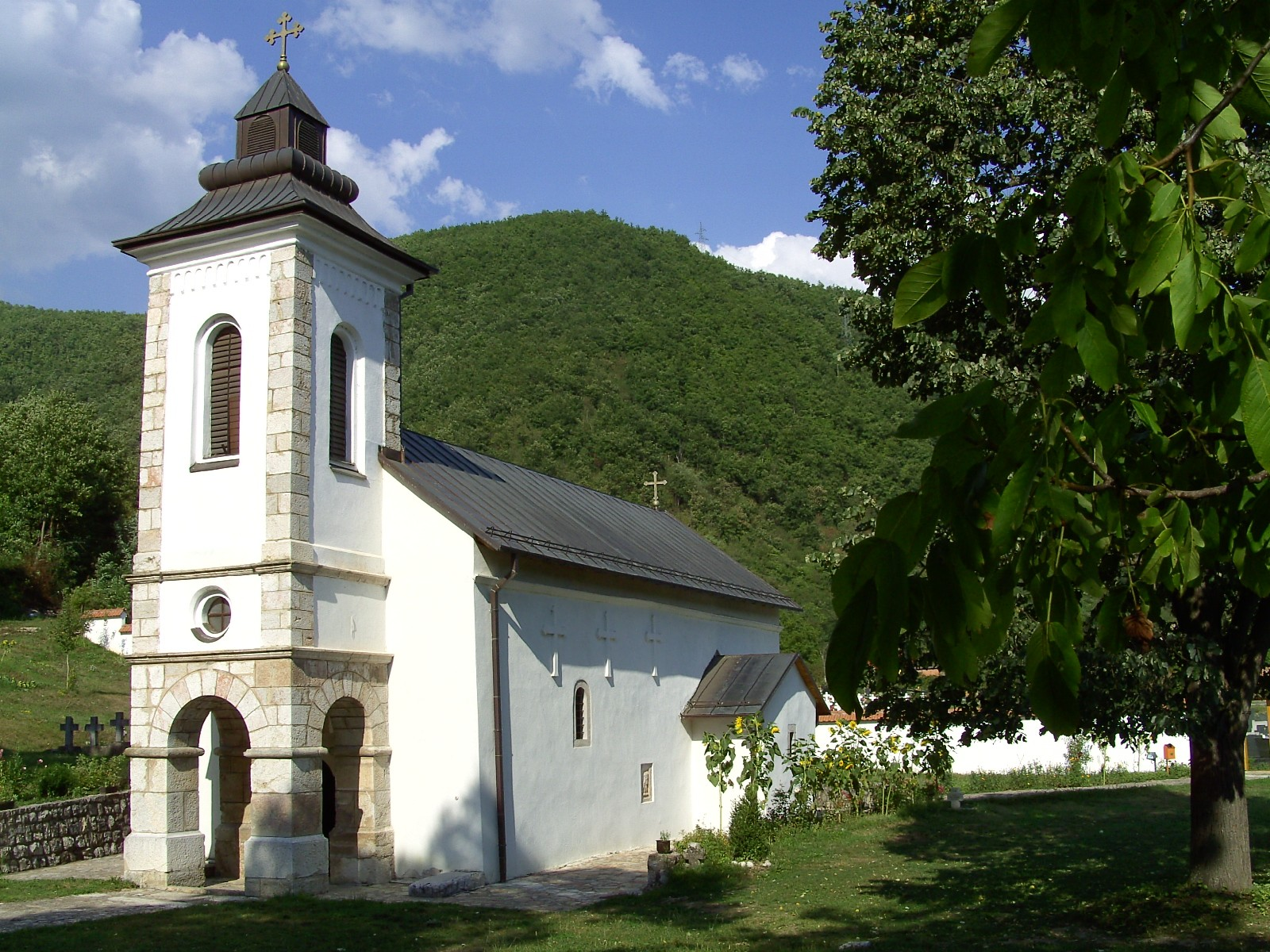
Church of St. George (in Sopotnica, Novo Goražde)

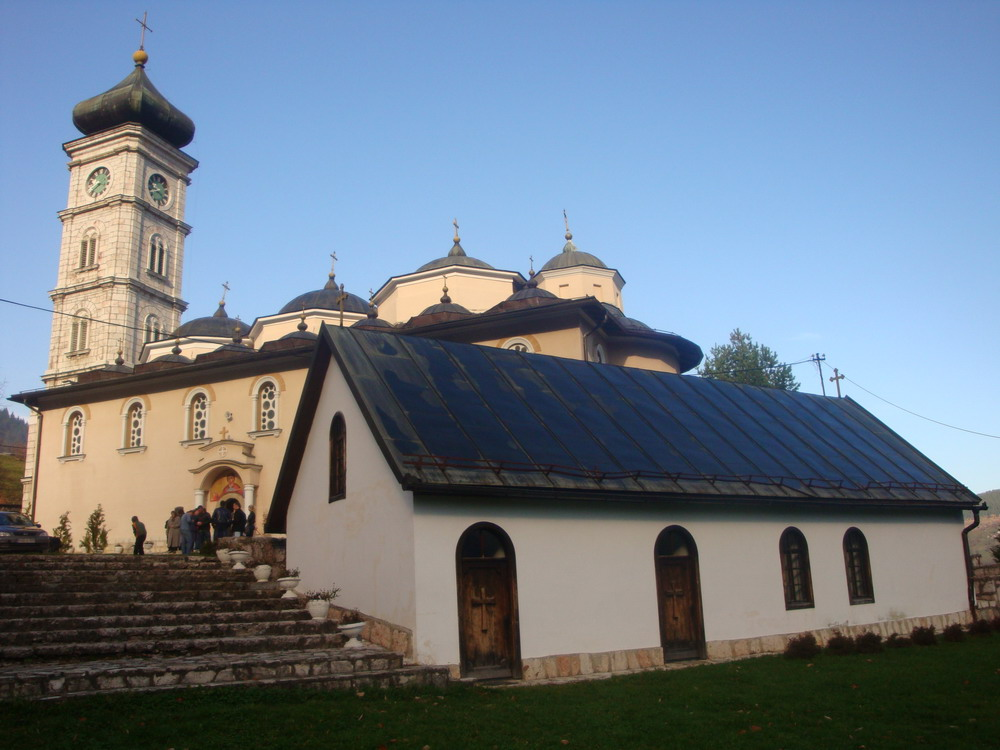
Čajniče Monastery
(in Čajniče)
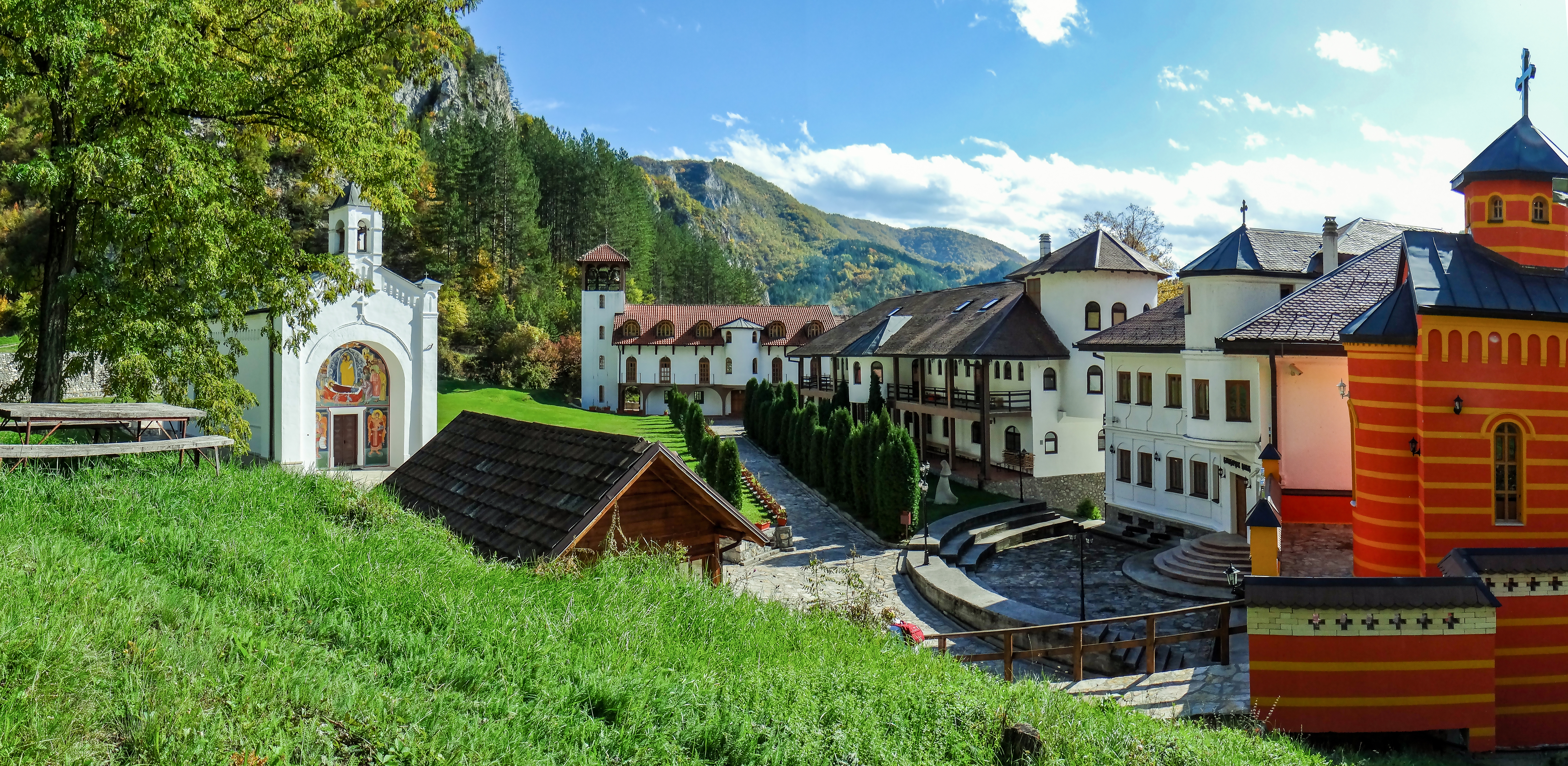
Dobrun Monastery
(near Višegrad)

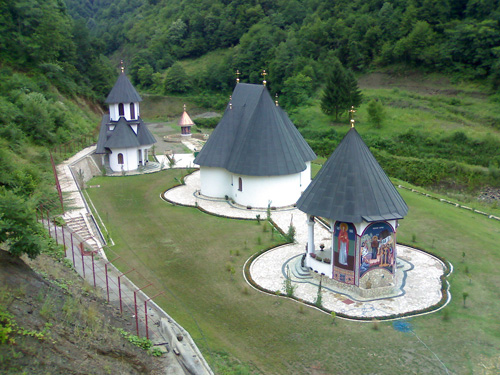
Sase Monastery
(between Bratunac and Srebrenica)

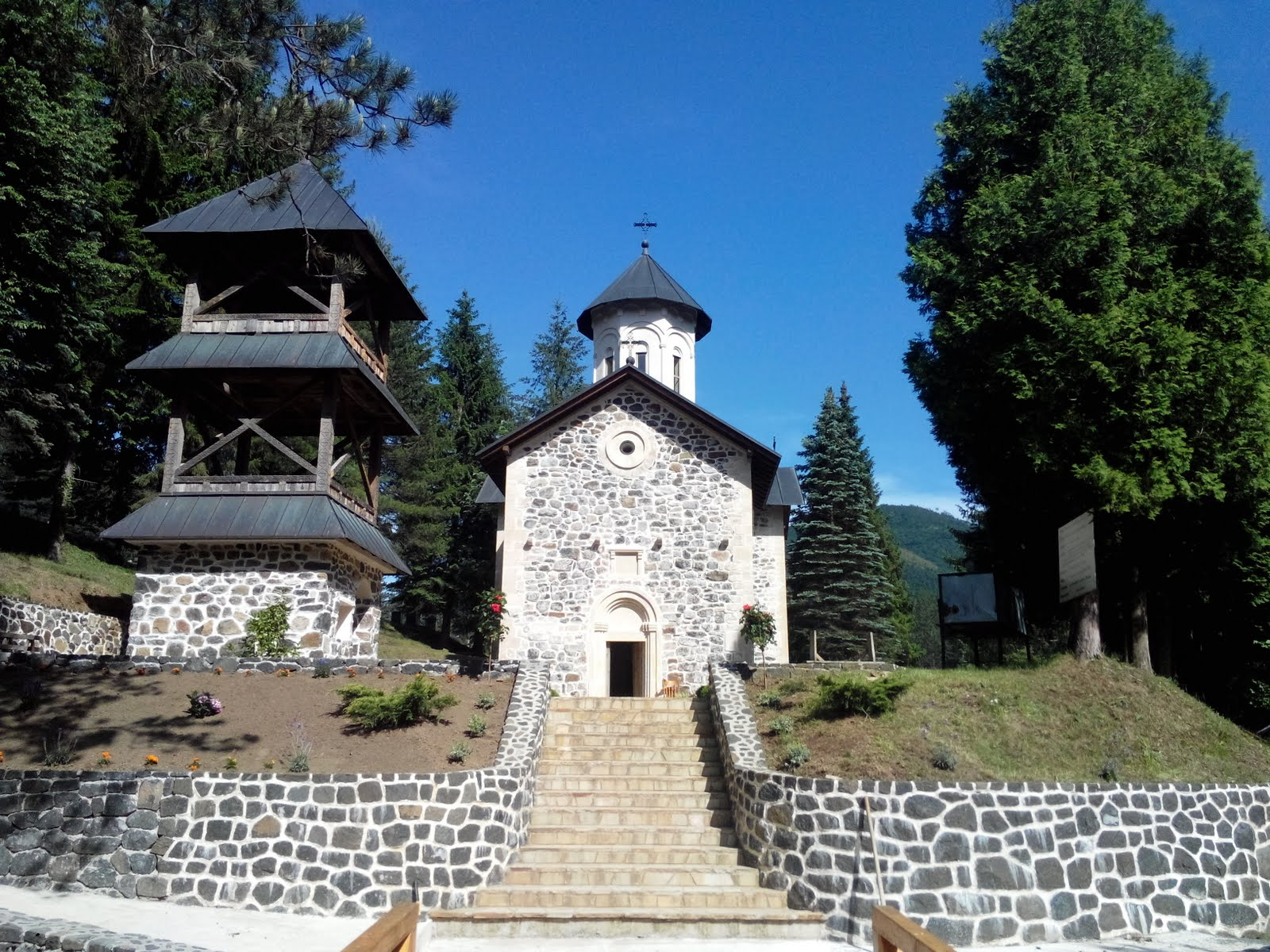
Vozuća Monastery
(near Zavidovići)

== See also ==
- Eastern Orthodoxy in Bosnia and Herzegovina
- Eparchies and metropolitanates of the Serbian Orthodox Church
- Serbs of Bosnia and Herzegovina

== Sources ==
- Поповић, Јевсевије (1912). Опћа црквена историја. Vol. 2. Сремски Карловци: Српска манастирска штампарија.
- Kašić, Dušan, ed. (1972). Serbian Orthodox Church: Its past and present. Vol. 3. Belgrade: Serbian Orthodox Church.
- Богдановић, Димитрије (1981). "Преображај српске цркве". Историја српског народа. Vol. књ. 1. Београд: Српска књижевна задруга. pp. 315–327.
- Јанковић, Марија (1985). Епископије и митрополије Српске цркве у средњем веку (Bishoprics and Metropolitanates of Serbian Church in Middle Ages). Београд: Историјски институт САНУ.
- Нилевић, Борис (1990). Српска православна црква у Босни и Херцеговини до обнове Пећке патријаршије 1557. године (Serbian Orthodox Church in Bosnia and Herzegovina before the renewal of the Patriarchate of Peć in 1557). Сарајево: Веселин Маслеша. ISBN 9788621004270.
- Вуковић, Сава (1996). Српски јерарси од деветог до двадесетог века (Serbian Hierarchs from the 9th to the 20th Century). Евро, Унирекс, Каленић.
- Bataković, Dušan T. (1996). The Serbs of Bosnia & Herzegovina: History and Politics. Dialogue Association. ISBN 9782911527104.
- Mileusnić, Slobodan (1997). Spiritual Genocide: A survey of destroyed, damaged and desecrated churches, monasteries and other church buildings during the war 1991-1995 (1997). Belgrade: Museum of the Serbian Orthodox Church.
- Radić, Radmila (1998). "Serbian Orthodox Church and the War in Bosnia and Herzegovina". Religion and the War in Bosnia. Atlanta: Scholars Press. pp. 160–182. ISBN 9780788504280.
- Popović, Svetlana (2002). "The Serbian Episcopal sees in the thirteenth century (Српска епископска седишта у XIII веку)". Старинар (51: 2001): 171–184.
- Ćirković, Sima (2004). The Serbs. Malden: Blackwell Publishing. ISBN 9781405142915.
- Radosavljević, Nedeljko V. (2007). Грађа за историју Сарајевске (Дабробосанске) митрополије 1836-1878 (Sources for the History of Sarajevo (Dabrobosanska) Archdiocese, 1836-1878). Београд: Историјски институт САНУ. ISBN 9788677430610.
- Radosavljević, Nedeljko V. (2009). Шест портрета православних митрополита 1766-1891 (Portraits of Six Orthodox Mitropolitans 1766-1891). Београд: Историјски институт САНУ. ISBN 9788677430788.
- Radosavljević, Nedeljko V. (2011). "ДАБРОБОСАНСКА (САРАЈЕВСКА) МИТРОПОЛИЈА У РАТНОМ ПЕРИОДУ СРПСКЕ РЕВОЛУЦИЈЕ (1804−1815)". Istraživanja. 22: 205–219.
- Radosavljević, Nedeljko V. (2013). "Vikarni episkopi Dabrobosanske mitropolije (1766–1878)". Istorijski časopis. 62: 161–192.
- Kiminas, Demetrius (2009). The Ecumenical Patriarchate: A History of Its Metropolitanates with Annotated Hierarch Catalogs. Wildside Press LLC. ISBN 9781434458766.
- Јањић, Драгана (2011). "Белешке о Дабарској епископији (Writings on the Dabar's Diocese)" (PDF). Баштина (31): 133–148.
- Sotirović, Vladislav B. (2011). "The Serbian Patriarchate of Peć in the Ottoman Empire: The First Phase (1557–94)". Serbian Studies: Journal of the North American Society for Serbian Studies. 25 (2): 143–169. doi:10.1353/ser.2011.0038. S2CID 143629322.
- Marjanović, Milutin (1998). Banja na Limu kod Priboja. Kulturno prosvetna zajednica R. Srbije.
- P., Đ. (1894). Hronološki red mitropolita. Vol. ?. Штам. Шпиндлера и Лешнера.
