= Cathedral of the Nativity of the Theotokos, Sarajevo =

Serbian Orthodox cathedral in Sarajevo, Bosnia and Herzegovina

Coordinates: 43.8582°N 18.4251°E

Cathedral of the Nativity of the Theotokos
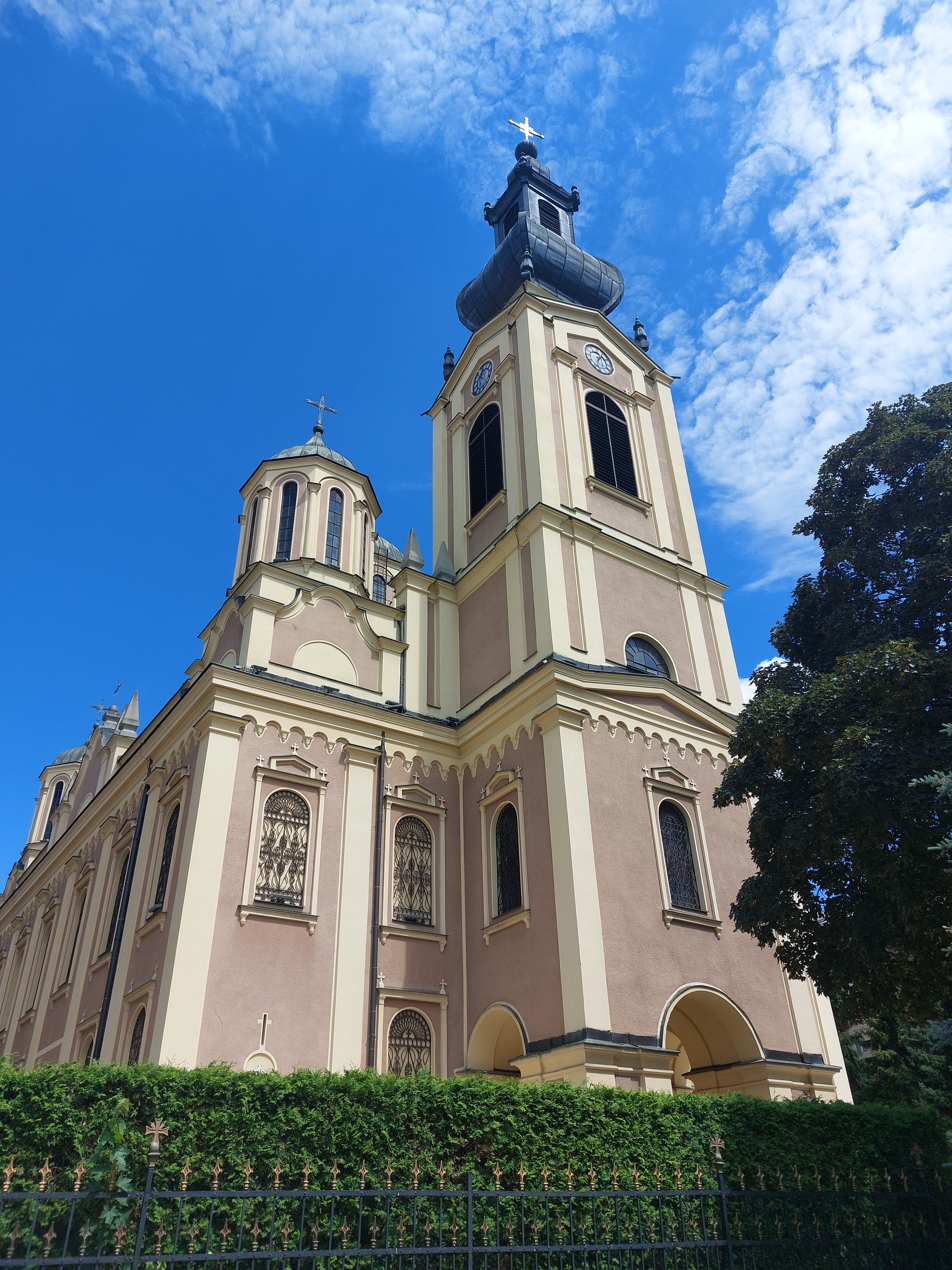
- Cathedral of the Nativity of the Theotokos, pictured in 2023

Religion
- Affiliation: Serbian Orthodox Church
- District: Metropolitanate of Dabar and Bosnia
- Year consecrated: 1872

Location
- Location: Sarajevo, Bosnia and Herzegovina
- Interactive map of Cathedral of the Nativity of the Theotokos

Architecture
- Architect: Andrey Damyanov
- Style: Baroque
- Completed: 1874
- Designated as NHL

KONS of Bosnia and Herzegovina
- Official name: Orthodox Cathedral church (church of the Holy Mother of God) with movable heritage, the historic building
- Type: Category I monument
- Criteria: II. Value; A, B, C i.ii.iii.iv.v.vi, D i.ii.iii.iv.v., E i.ii.iii.iv.v., F i.ii., G i.ii.iii.iv.v.vi, I i.ii.iii.iv.
- Designated: 5 July 2006 (session No. )
- Part of: Old Town of Sarajevo
- Reference no.: 2842
- Decision no.: 06.2-2122/06-5
- Listed: List of National Monuments of Bosnia and Herzegovina
- Operator: -

The Cathedral of the Nativity of the Theotokos (Serbian: Саборна црква Рођења Пресвете Богородице, romanized: Saborna crkva Rođenja Presvete Bogorodice), commonly known as the Orthodox Cathedral (Serbian: Православна саборна црква, romanized: Pravoslavna saborna crkva), is an Eastern Orthodox church located in Sarajevo, Bosnia and Herzegovina. It is under jurisdiction of the Metropolitanate of Dabar and Bosnia of the Serbian Orthodox Church and serves as its cathedral church.

The Cathedral of the Nativity of the Theotokos was designated in 2006 as the National Monument of Bosnia and Herzegovina by the Commission to Preserve National Monuments of Bosnia and Herzegovina.

== History ==
The construction of the church commenced in 1863 when Sarajevo was part of the Bosnia Vilayet, itself a subdivision within the Ottoman Empire. Most of the 36,000 dukat construction cost was covered by Sarajevo's Serb merchants, led by Manojlo Jeftanović who donated 2,000 dukats. In a symbolic act, the Ottoman sultan Abdülaziz and the ruler of Serbia, Prince Mihailo Obrenović, each donated 500 dukats. Russian Tsar Alexander II sent expert craftsmen to construct the iconostasis. Known locally as the 'New Orthodox Church' to distinguish it from the sixteenth-century church a few hundred meters to the east, it was the first building to break the Muslim monopoly on monumental edifices in Sarajevo. Prota Stevan Baković personally consecrated foundations during groundbreaking.

Once the church was built, its tower that rose above many of the town's mosques became a sore point with local conservative Muslims who wanted traditional limitations on non-Muslim architecture to be imposed. The same group also objected to a small bell that was installed on the old Serbian Orthodox Church at around the same time. The new church dedication ceremony was scheduled for May 1871; however, a group of forty lower-class Muslims, led by a Sarajevo imam Salih Vilajetović (better known as Hadži Lojo), sought to block it. When notified of the intended obstruction, the Bosnian Vilayet's Ottoman governor ordered the police to arrest Hadži Lojo and his followers. Six were arrested while others fled when the police arrived. Led by merchant Jeftanović, members of the Serbian community lodged a protest with the Russian consul in Sarajevo, and Russian diplomats shortly thereafter protested the episode to the Ottoman sultan. The dedication ceremony was postponed for a year.

The next year, in the summer of 1872, the Ottoman officials dispatched a new military commander with more than thousand men in order to provide security for the church dedication. Concerned about local Muslim vandal attacks, as a show of force the Ottoman governor ordered the positioning of a cannon above the city and the deployment of troops to guard the ceremony. The festive dedication on 20 July 1872, attended by high Ottoman officials and by the young Austro-Hungarian ambassador to Serbia, Béni Kállay (who would later play an important role in Bosnia), proceeded without incident.

== Architecture ==
The cathedral is constructed as a three-section basilica inscribed in a cross-shaped plan, and has five domes. The domes are built on the beams; the central one is much larger than the other four side domes. The church is arched by round elements. The small gilded baroque-style belfry is built in front of the entrance. The interior walls are decorated by painted ornaments. In the lower zones of the walls the painted ornaments are simulating the marble stone construction look. Arches and vaults are decorated in ornaments only. In 1898, the Orthodox Metropolitan Palace was built near the cathedral. The head master for construction was Andreja Damjanov, a man from the Damjanovi-Renzovski family of master builders, masons, painters, carpenters, and stonecutters from the village of Papradište, near Veles.

== Gallery ==
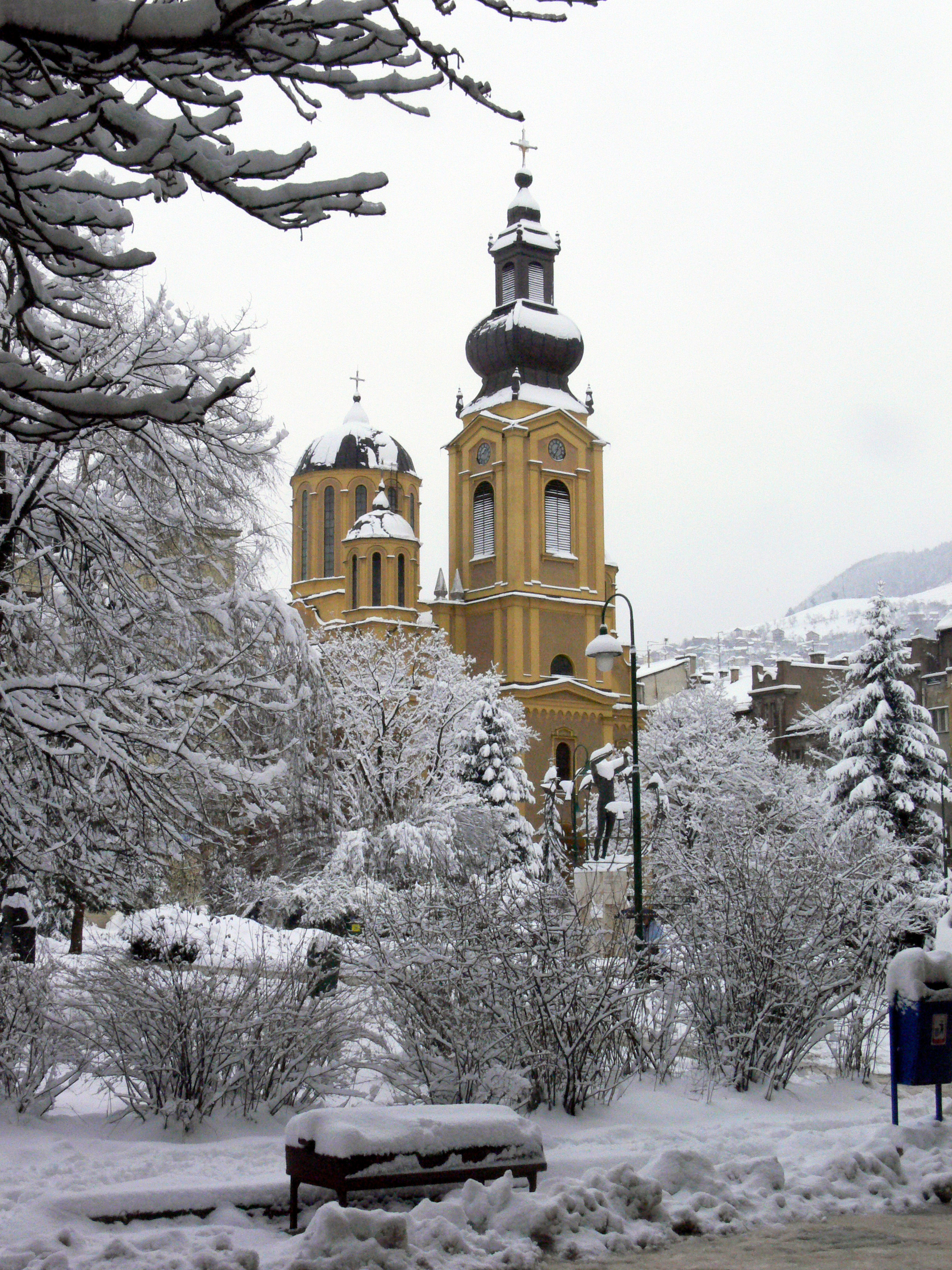
Cathedral in winter

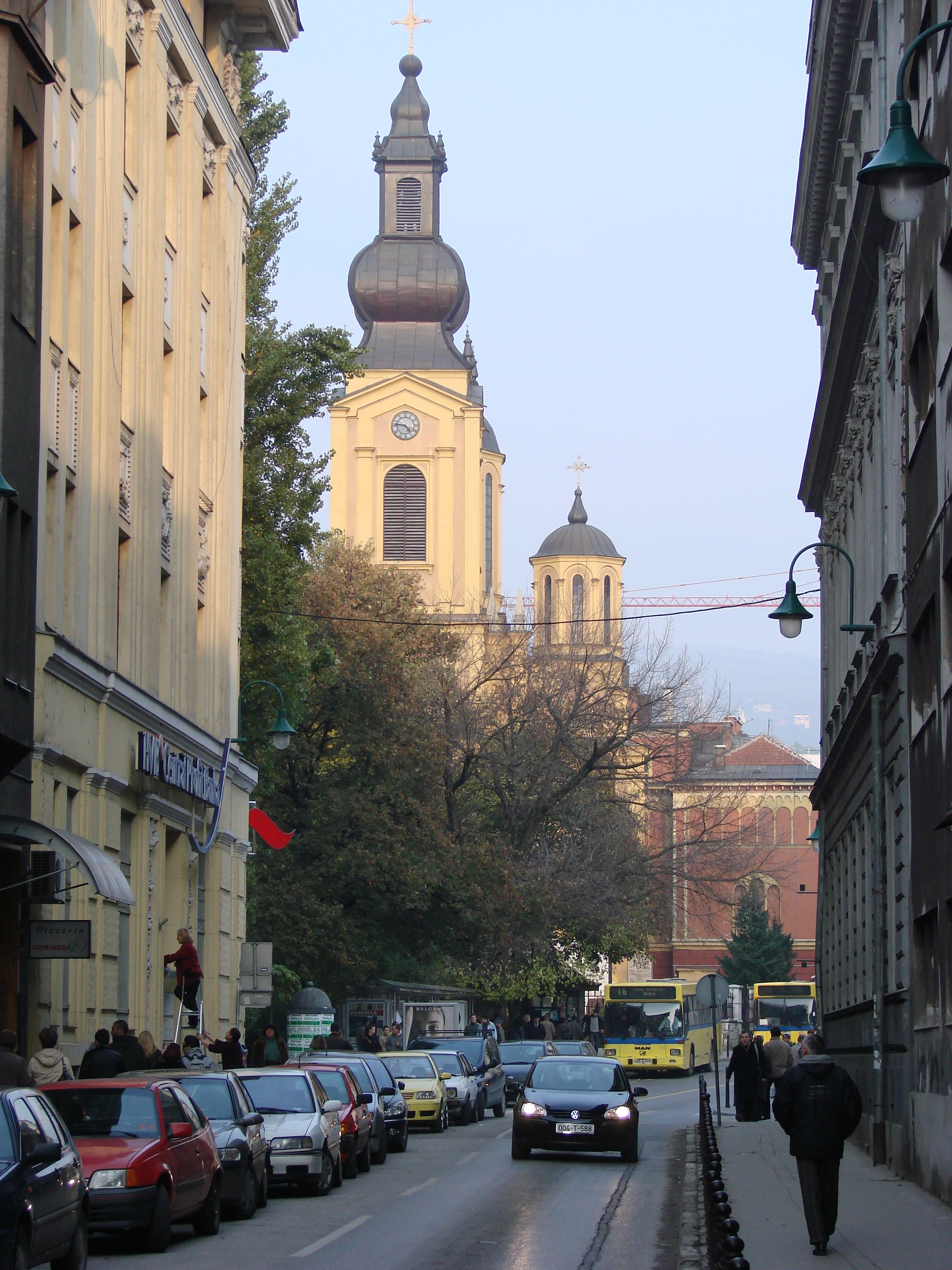
View from side street

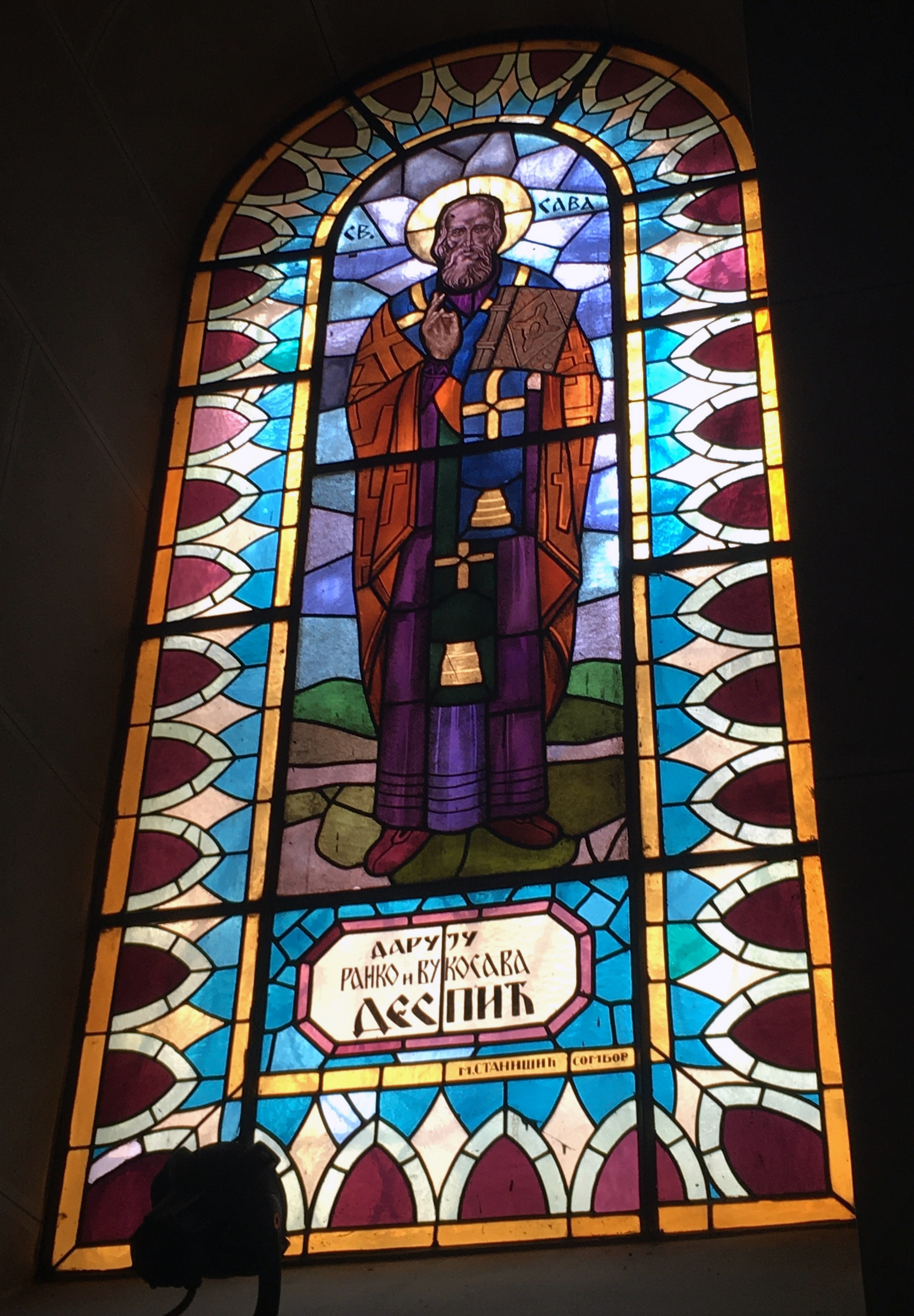
Vitrage

== See also ==
- List of cathedrals
- Church of the Holy Archangels Michael and Gabriel
- Church of the Holy Transfiguration
- Serbs of Sarajevo
