= Stevan Baković =

19th-century Orthodox priest from Bosnia and Herzegovina

Stevan Baković (Ožegovac, 1794—Sarajevo, 1893), popularly known as Prota Baković, was a priest of the Serbian Orthodox Church, who spent most of his ministry in Sarajevo. He is one of the most deserving people for the construction of the Cathedral in Sarajevo, whose foundations he personally consecrated. He was appreciated and respected by the people regardless of religion and ethnicity, and his death represented a great loss for the Serbian people in Sarajevo at the time. The people of Sarajevo considered him to be a man of great character and a true patriot, and a model priest for the church and the people.

== Biography ==
Prota Stevan Baković was born in 1794 in the village of Ožegovac in Herzegovina, at the time Eyalet of Bosnia, in an Orthodox family, to father Prodan and mother Anđelija. He did not spend much time in his native village because shortly after his birth, his family moved to the village of Crljenice, which today belongs to the municipality of Pljevlja in Montenegro. After he was ten years old, around 1804, his parents took him to the Holy Trinity Monastery to begin his education, under the then Metropolitan Jeremije of Herzegovina. In 1812, Stevan married Jelka, the daughter of Trivko Zec from Foča, and decided to devote the rest of his life to a priestly vocation. The following year, he was preparing for the priestly rank, and continued to live with his wife in the monastery of the Holy Trinity.

In 1813, he came to Sarajevo for the first time, where on June 28 and 29, according to the old calendar, the then Metropolitan Venijamin ordained him as a priest. He served in Sarajevo for two years, after which he went to visit his relatives in Pljevlje, from where he went to Serbia, where Miloš Obrenović started an uprising. Prince Miloš's invitation to remain active in the uprising, he refused due to a sudden illness, when he returned to the Holy Trinity Monastery, where he remained until he was healthy. He performed his priestly duties for a short time in Stolac, and then in Duvno, until around 1823, Metropolitan Vanijamin of Metropolitanate of Dabar-Bosnia appointed him permanent parish priest in Sarajevo, near the Old Church. In 1840, Bishop Amvrosije ordained him to the rank of provost. During the time of Archpriest Stevan, twelve bishops changed in the Metropolitanate of Dabar-Bosnia. In 1882, he was appointed by King Milan as an honorary member of the consistory, and Metropolitan Sava Kosanović, the first among all protas, awarded him a pectoral cross.

In 1862, the foundation was laid for the construction of the Cathedral in Sarajevo, in which great merit was due to prota Baković. The governor, the wali, all the Ottoman gentry and the vizier's entourage then arrived for the consecration of the foundation. Tents were pitched at the vizier's expense, and the municipality of Sarajevo prepared sweet sherbe, cakes and black coffee. When Proto Stevan Baković went down to the foundation of the church with a cross in his hand and consecrated the water, the vizier and all the Muslims and the bishop with the clergy stood above, while proto, six meters into the ground, consecrating the foundation and the first stone and threw money and charters of to be built in foundation.

Until his old age, until 1887, proto Baković performed his priestly duties, when the faithful people, the city administration and the Orthodox municipality of Sarajevo repaid him by awarding him a lifelong pension in the amount of seventy forints a month. Although he was already retired, by then the old proto came to the church and held services until 1890, when he became completely exhausted and fell into bed.

Prota Steva Baković lived with his wife for seventy-six years, and passed away on the eve of April 9, 1893, according to the old calendar.

== Legacy ==
In the old center of Sarajevo, on Baščaršija, in the immediate vicinity of the Old Orthodox Church, one of the streets is named after Prota Baković.

== See also ==
- Sacred Heart Cathedral

== Bibliography ==
- "Прото Стеван Баковић". Босанска вила. 8 и 9. 1893.
- "Хаџи Максо Деспић: Записи старог Сарајлије; Постанак наше цркве у Сарајеву; Како је почета 1862, а свршена и освештана 1872 године". Политика. 11776. 1941.
