= Church of the Holy Transfiguration, Sarajevo =

Serbian Orthodox church in Sarajevo, Bosnia and Herzegovina

Coordinates: 43.8533°N 18.3909°E

Church of the Holy Transfiguration
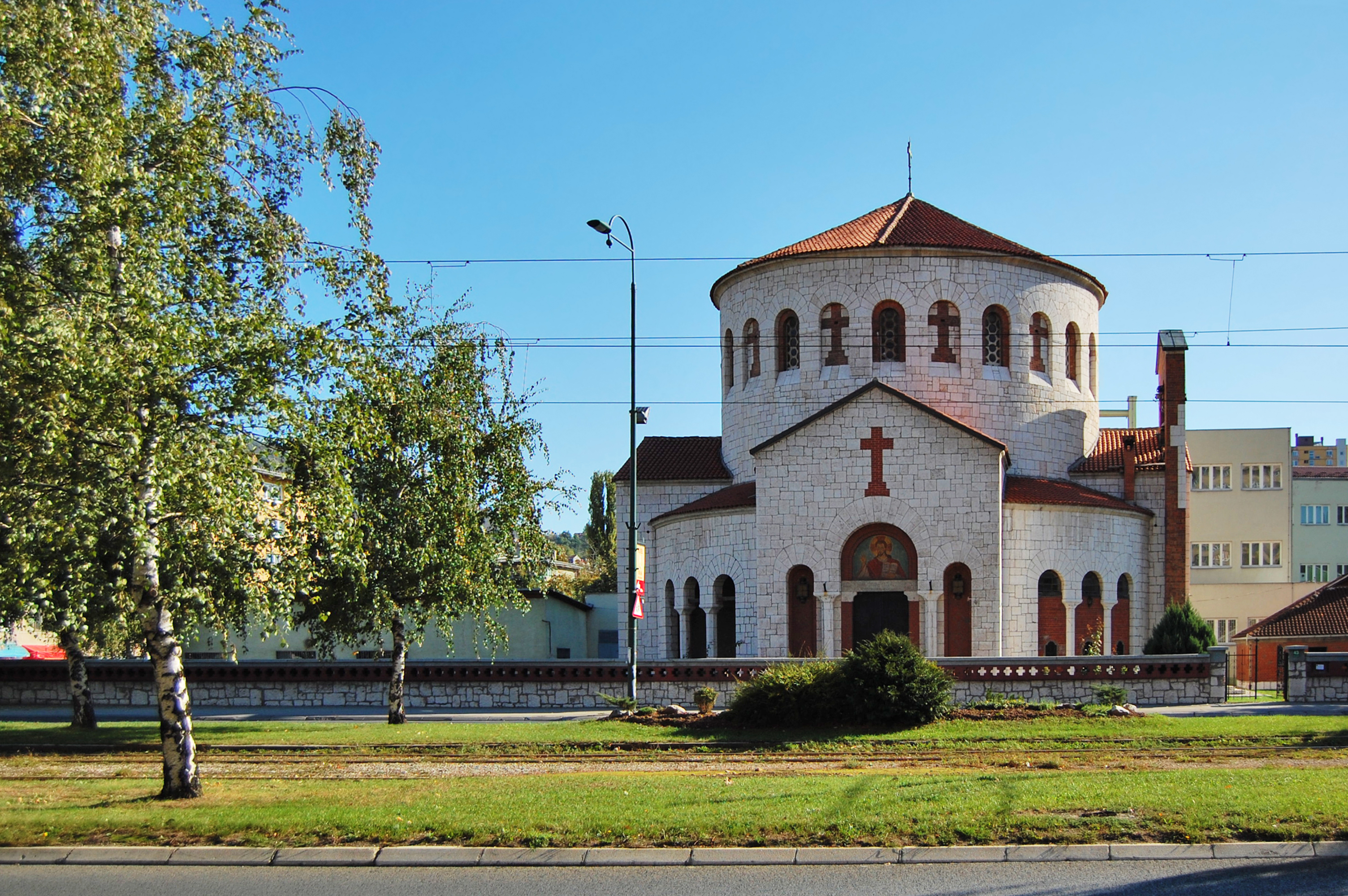
- Church of the Holy Transfiguration, pictured in 2011

Religion
- Affiliation: Serbian Orthodox Church
- District: Metropolitanate of Dabar and Bosnia
- Year consecrated: 1940

Location
- Location: Sarajevo, Bosnia and Herzegovina
- Interactive map of Church of the Holy Transfiguration

Architecture
- Architect: Aleksandar Deroko
- Completed: 1940

The Church of the Holy Transfiguration (Serbian: Црква Светог Преображења, romanized: Crkva Svetog Preobraženja) is an Eastern Orthodox church located in Sarajevo, Bosnia and Herzegovina. It is under jurisdiction of the Metropolitanate of Dabar and Bosnia of the Serbian Orthodox Church.

Originally planned for Split in Croatia, it was built in 1940 by Aleksandar Deroko and consecrated by Serbian Patriarch Gavrilo V. It is the only Orthodox church in Novo Sarajevo.

During the Bosnian War, the church was heavily damaged, and after the war it was renovated. Reworking of frescoes began in 2004.

== See also ==
- Cathedral of the Nativity of the Theotokos
- Church of the Holy Archangels Michael and Gabriel
- Serbs of Sarajevo
