= Žljebovi =

- Village
- The Church of the Holy Apostle Thomas, 2026

- Location within Bosnia and Herzegovina
- Coordinates: 43°59′51″N 18°52′57″E
- Country: Bosnia and Herzegovina
- Entity: Republika Srpska
- Municipality: Sokolac

Population (2013)
  - Total: 148
- Time zone: UTC+1 (CET)
  - Summer (DST): UTC+2 (CEST)

Žljebovi (Serbian: Жљебови) is a village in the municipality of Sokolac, Bosnia and Herzegovina. According to the 2013 census, it has a population of 148 people.

== Name ==
Žljebovi's name means grooves or channels.

== Demographics ==
According to the 2013 census, Žljebovi has a population of 148 people. Since 1961, the population has declined.

== Geography and religion ==
Žljebovi is located 10 km from the town of Sokolac. It is described as being between the dioceses of the Metropolitanate of Dabar and Bosnia and the Eparchy of Zvornik and Tuzla. In February 2017, Bosnian prelate Hrizostom Jević visited the village.

== Media ==
The final scenes of the film "Linija" ("The Line") about the Exodus of Sarajevo Serbs were filmed in Žljebovi.

Historical population
| Year | Pop. | ±% p.a. |
|---|---|---|
| 1895 | 177 | — |
| 1910 | 246 | +2.22% |
| 1948 | 303 | +0.55% |
| 1954 | 312 | +0.49% |
| 1961 | 323 | +0.50% |
| 1971 | 242 | −2.85% |
| 1981 | 183 | −2.76% |
| 1991 | 171 | −0.68% |
| 2013 | 148 | −0.65% |
