= Demographics of Sarajevo =

The population of the city of Sarajevo's four municipalities is 275,524, whereas the Sarajevo Canton population is estimated at 413,593.

== Ethnic composition by municipalities, 2013 census ==
Ethnic composition of Sarajevo, by municipalities, 2013 census
municipality	total	Bosniaks	Serbs	Croats	others
Centar	55,181	41,702 (75.57%)	2,186 (3.96%)	3,333 (6.04%)	7,960 (14.42%)
Novi Grad	118,553	99,773 (84.16%)	4,367 (3.68%)	4,947 (4.17%)	9,466 (7.98%)
Novo Sarajevo	64,814	48,188 (74.35%)	3,402 (5.25%)	4,639 (7.16%)	8,585 (13.24%)
Stari Grad	36,976	32,794 (88.69%)	467 (1.3%)	685 (1.85%)	3,030 (8.19%)
total	275,524	222,457 (80.74%)	10,422 (3.78%)	13,604 (4.94%)	29,041 (10.54%)

== 1991 census ==
- Sarajevo (four municipalities: Centar, Novi Grad, Novo Sarajevo and Stari Grad)

total: 361,735

- The greater area of Sarajevo (ten municipalities: Centar, Ilidža, Hadžići, Ilijaš, Novi Grad, Novo Sarajevo, Pale, Stari Grad, Trnovo and Vogošća)

total: 527,049

=== Ethnic composition by municipalities, 1991 census ===
Ethnic composition of Sarajevo, by municipalities, 1991. census
municipality	total	ethnic Muslims (modern Bosniaks)	Serbs	Yugoslavs	Croats	others
Centar	79,286	39,761 (50.14%)	16,631 (20.97%)	13,030 (16.43%)	5,428 (6.84%)	4,436 (5.59%)
Novi Grad	136,616	69,430 (50.82%)	37,591 (27.51%)	15,580 (11.40%)	8,889 (6.50%)	5,126 (3.75%)
Novo Sarajevo	95,089	33,902 (35.65%)	32,899 (34.59%)	15,099 (15.87%)	8,798 (9.25%)	4,391 (4.61%)
Stari Grad	50,744	39,410 (77.66%)	5,150 (10.14%)	3,374 (6.64%)	1,126 (2.21%)	1,684 (3.31%)
total	361,735	182,503 (50.45%)	92,271 (25.50%)	47,083 (13.01%)	24,241 (6.70%)	15,637 (4.32%)

Ethnic composition of Sarajevo Canton, by municipalities, 1991. census
municipality	total	ethnic Muslims (modern Bosniaks)	Serbs	Yugoslavs	Croats	others
Centar	79,286	39,761 (50.14%)	16,631 (20.97%)	13,030 (16.43%)	5,428 (6.84%)	4,436 (5.59%)
Hadžići	24,200	15,392 (63.60%)	6,362 (26.28%)	841 (3.47%)	746 (3.08%)	859 (3.54%)
Ilidža	67,937	29,337 (43.18%)	25,029 (36.84%)	5,181 (7.62%)	6,934 (10.20%)	1,456 (2.14%)
Ilijaš	25,184	10,585 (42.03%)	11,325 (44.96%)	1,167 (4.63%)	1,736 (6.89%)	371 (1.47%)
Novi Grad	136,616	69,430 (50.82%)	37,591 (27.51%)	15,580 (11.40%)	8,889 (6.50%)	5,126 (3.75%)
Novo Sarajevo	95,089	33,902 (35.65%)	32,899 (34.59%)	15,099 (15.87%)	8,798 (9.25%)	4,391 (4.61%)
Pale	16,355	4,364 (26.68%)	11,284 (68.99%)	396 (2.42%)	129 (0.78%)	182 (1.11%)
Stari Grad	50,744	39,410 (77.66%)	5,150 (10.14%)	3,374 (6.64%)	1,126 (2.21%)	1,684 (3.31%)
Trnovo	6,991	4,790 (68.81%)	2,059 (29.45%)	72 (1.02%)	16 (0.22%)	54 (0.77%)
Vogošća	24,647	12,499 (50.71%)	8,813 (35.75%)	1,730 (7.01%)	1,071 (4.34%)	534 (2.16%)
total	527,049	259,470 (49.23%)	157,143 (29.81%)	56,470 (10.71%)	34,873 (6.61%)	19,093 (3.62%)

== Historical population ==
Historically Sarajevo had always been a very populous city, but as the Ottoman Empire declined, so did its population. Although it had around 100,000 people in the 1660s, by the end of World War II in the 1940s Sarajevo had only grown to some 115,000 people.

The population of the district of Sarajevo, according to the 1921 Kingdom of Serbs, Croats and Slovenes religious population census:

- Serbian Orthodox Christians 55,477 (38.6%)
- Sunni Muslims 50,270 (34.9%)
- Roman Catholic Christians 29,395 (20.4%)
- Others 8,768 (6.1%)

In 1921 there were 8 municipalities, and their populations were:

- Serbs comprised majorities in 5 municipalities: Ilidža, Koševo, Pale, Rajlovac, and Trnovo.
- Bosniaks comprised majorities in the City of Sarajevo and in 2 municipalities: Bjelašnica and Ozren.

The same year, the City of Sarajevo had 78,173 inhabitants:

- Sunni Muslims 29,649 (37.9%)
- Roman Catholic Christians 21,373 (27.3%)
- Serbian Orthodox Christians 18,630 (23.8%)
- Others 8,522 (11.0%)

Heavy industrialization and increased importance in regional affairs during the time of Yugoslavia resulted in a rapid increase, however, and by the time of the 1984 Olympics, the greater Sarajevo area had more than 500,000 residents. Although exact ethnic distribution is unknown, of these 500,000, 49% were Muslim, 30% Orthodox Christians, and 7% Catholics, indicating relatively corresponding percentages of Bosniaks, Serbs, and Croats.

The Yugoslav wars and the resulting siege of Sarajevo radically disrupted this order of things. The city itself was completely surrounded by Bosnian Serb forces, and it has been estimated that some 12,000 people were killed, with another 50,000 wounded. Combined with horrific living conditions forced upon by the besieging forces, the result was thousands of refugees leaving the city. By 1996, Sarajevo had less than 300,000 residents. The majority Sarajevan Serbs, massively fled the Bosnian capital, with their fears fuelled by propaganda, rumors and mass panic. Early estimates stated 62,000 Serbs leaving Sarajevo, In the years that followed, a tremendous influx of returning refugees and people from a war-torn countryside resulted in the city population once again going above 300,000 residents.

The following are some recorded populations of Sarajevo throughout its history. The figures from 1580 and 1800 are from H. Inalcık, An Economic and Social History of the Ottoman Empire (1994). The figures from 1626 and 1660 are based on the accounts of traveling writers who estimated that Sarajevo at the time had 20,000 houses, and figures an average of 5 people per house. All latter figures are based on official censuses by Austria-Hungary, the Kingdom of Yugoslavia, and Socialist Yugoslavia, except for that of 2002, which is an estimate by the Sarajevo Canton government. All figures after 1945 represent the greater Sarajevo area.

Year	Population
1580	40,000
1626	more than 60,000
1660	more than 100,000
1800	between 40,000 and 45,000
1910	51,919
1921	66,317
1931	78,173
1945	115,000
1971	359,448
1991	527,049
2002	401,118

== Population density ==
According to the official government statistics, Sarajevo's population density is 2470.1 per square kilometer. The most densely populated part of Sarajevo is in the municipality Novo Sarajevo (7524.5 inhabitants per square kilometer), while the least densely populated is the Stari Grad municipality (742.5 inhabitants per square kilometer).

== Age ==
Regarding the age structure of Sarajevo, the overwhelming majority of people are between 15 and 64 years of age. This group consists of 208,703 people, a little over 70% of the total city population. When it comes to people 14 years of age or under and people over 65 years of age, the youth have a slight edge. There are 47,558 people under 14 years of age in Sarajevo, making up 16% of the overall population, compared to 41,138 people over 65 years of age, who make up 13.8% of the total population. The Novi Grad municipality has the highest percentage of citizens under 14 years of age in the city, at 17.4%, while 17.5% of Novo Sarajevo municipality's population is over 65 years of age. Overall, the city's population is slightly older than its surrounding areas and the Federation of Bosnia and Herzegovina as a whole.

== Ethnic groups ==
The biggest ethnic group in Sarajevo are the Bosniaks who, with more than 230,000 people, make up 77.4% of the city. They are followed by the Serbs, of which there are some 10,000 (3% of the city), and Croats with a population of 14,000 (5% of the total population). 9,283 people (3.1% of the overall population) are classified as others. They most likely consist of Sephardi Jews, and Romani, along with a small number of foreign workers and also Bosnians who come from mixed marriages and do not take either side as their own, other than simply 'others' or Bosnians.

== Birth rate ==
The city's birth rate is 9.17 while the mortality is 8.10, resulting in a population growth rate of 1.07. The greater Sarajevo area, meanwhile, has a 9.56 birth rate and 8.01 mortality rate, which makes for a population growth rate of about 1.55. This would indicate a population of 303,797 in the city by December 2004, and a population of 413,649 in the metropolitan area. If current growth trends continue, the city's population should reach the pre-war population in less than 25 years. The metro area would do the same a bit sooner, in some 15 years.

== Ethnic maps ==
1961–1981 censuses

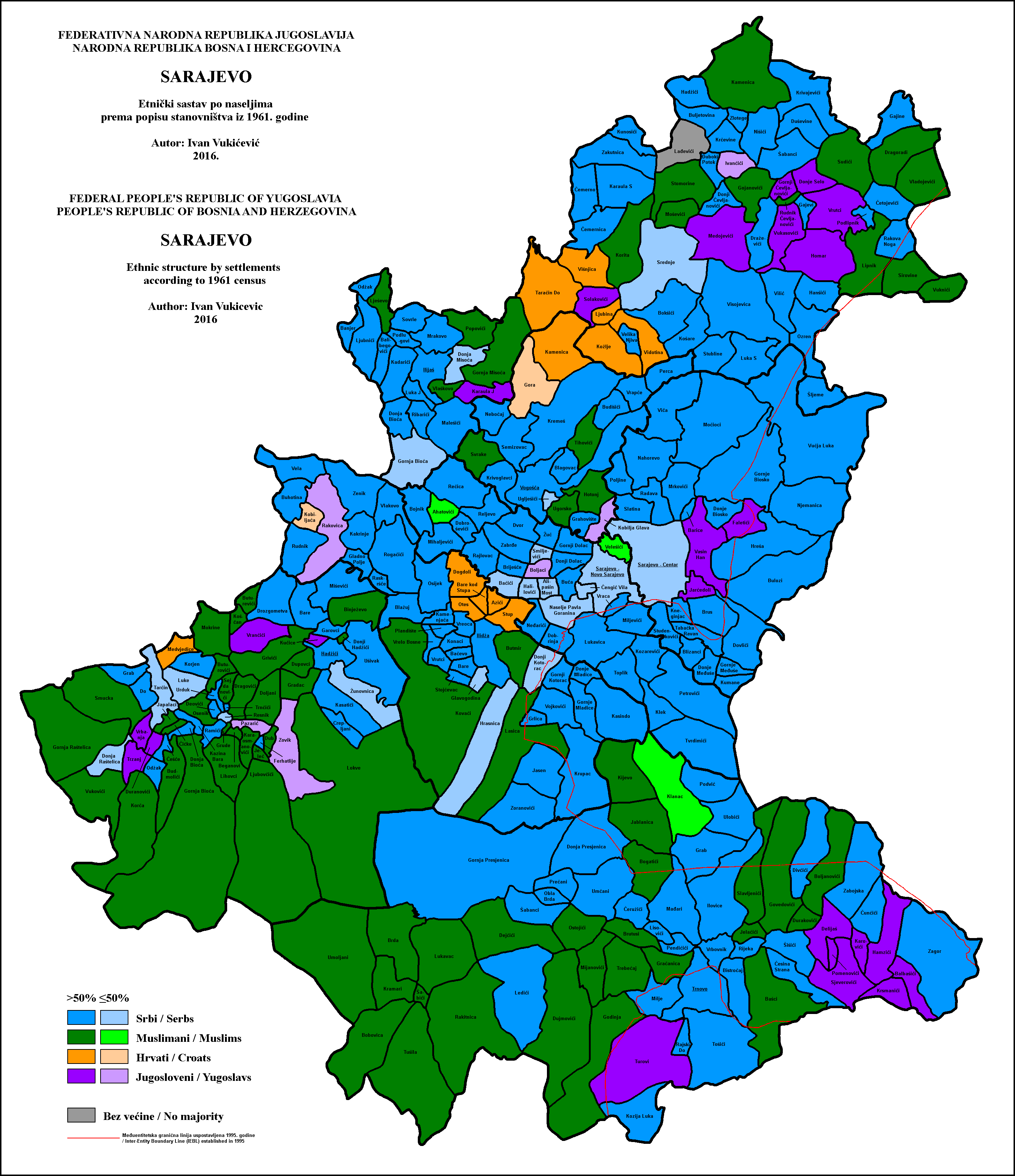
Ethnic structure of Sarajevo by settlements 1961

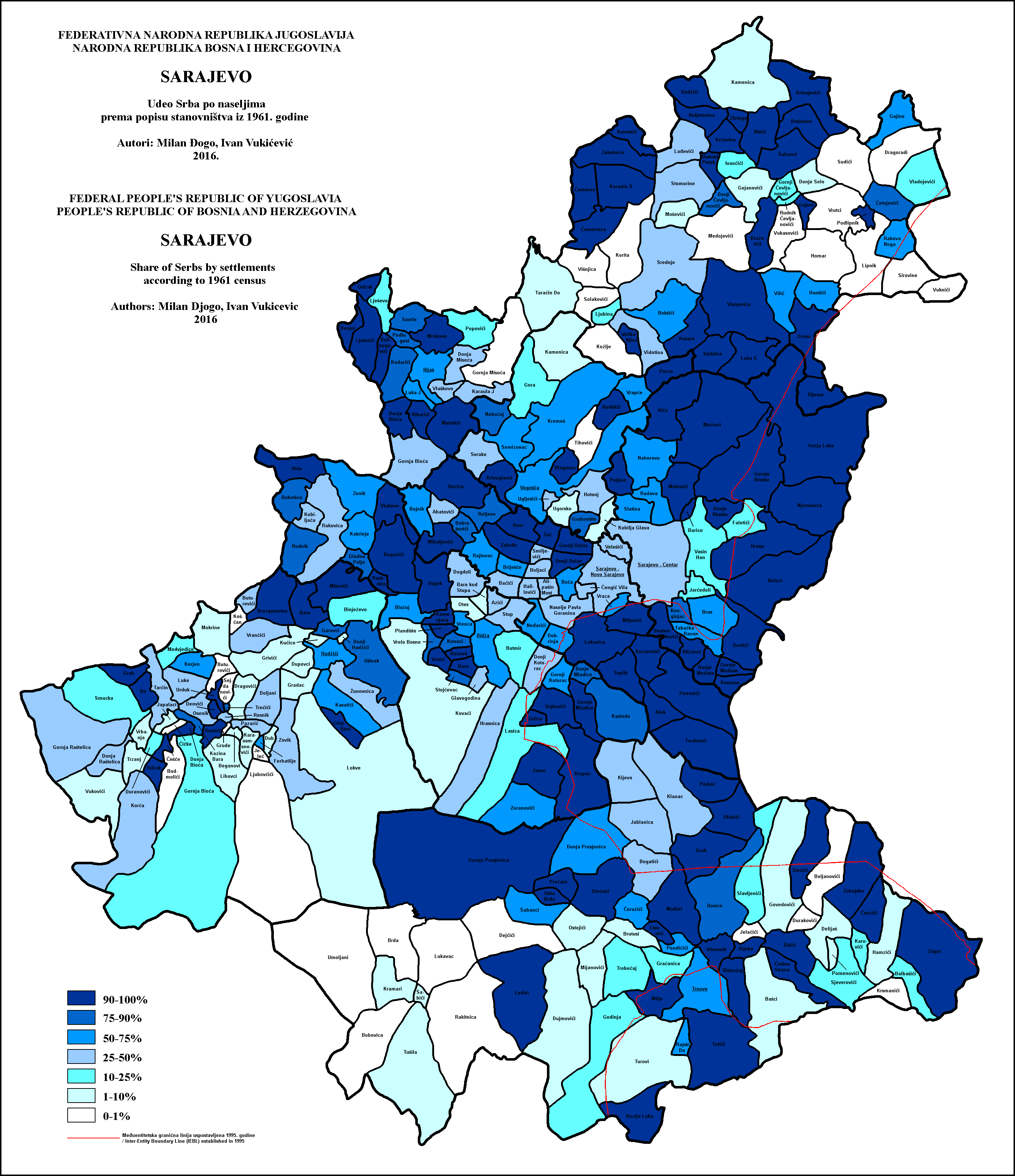
Share of Serbs in Sarajevo by settlements 1961

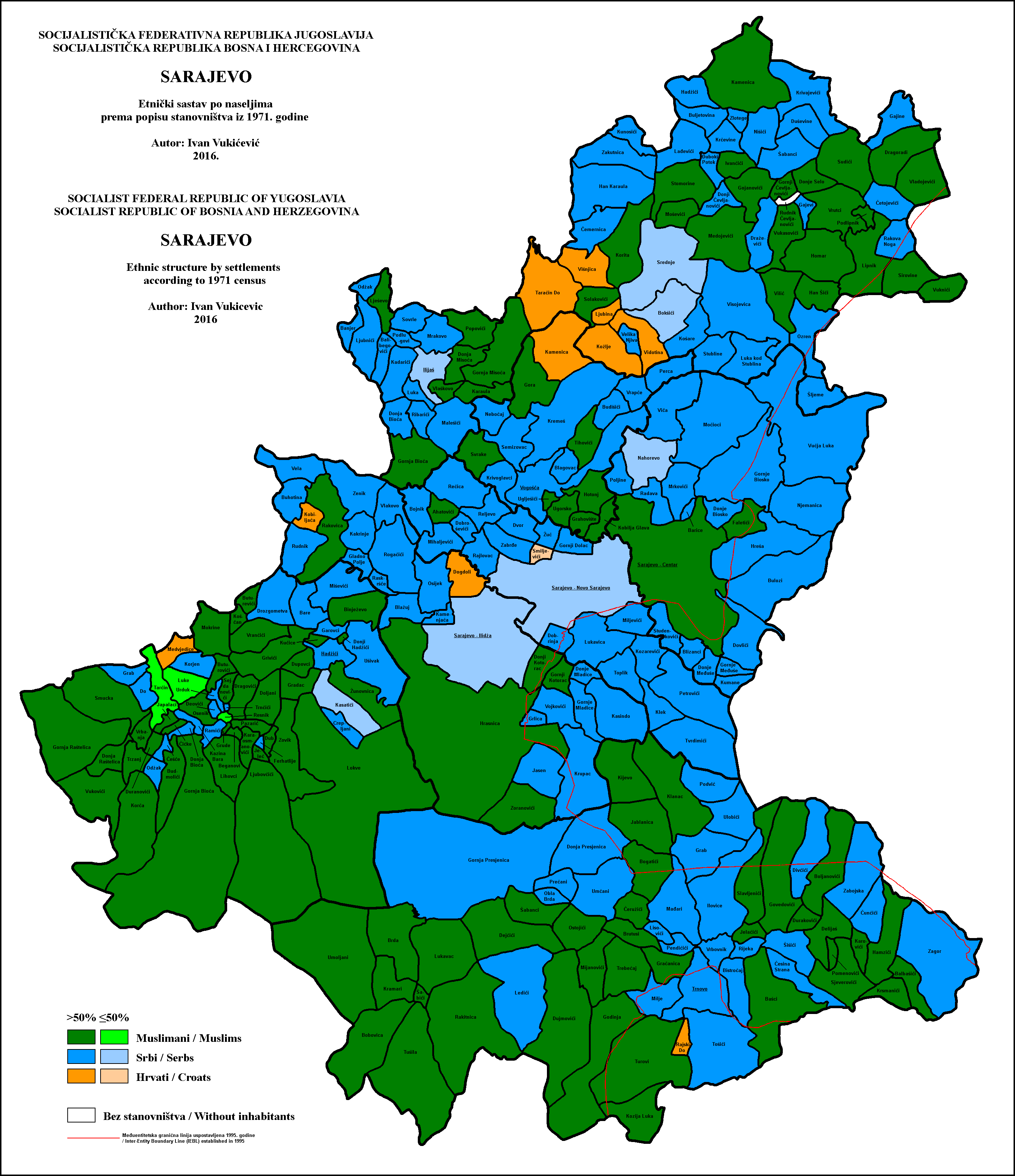
Ethnic structure of Sarajevo by settlements 1971

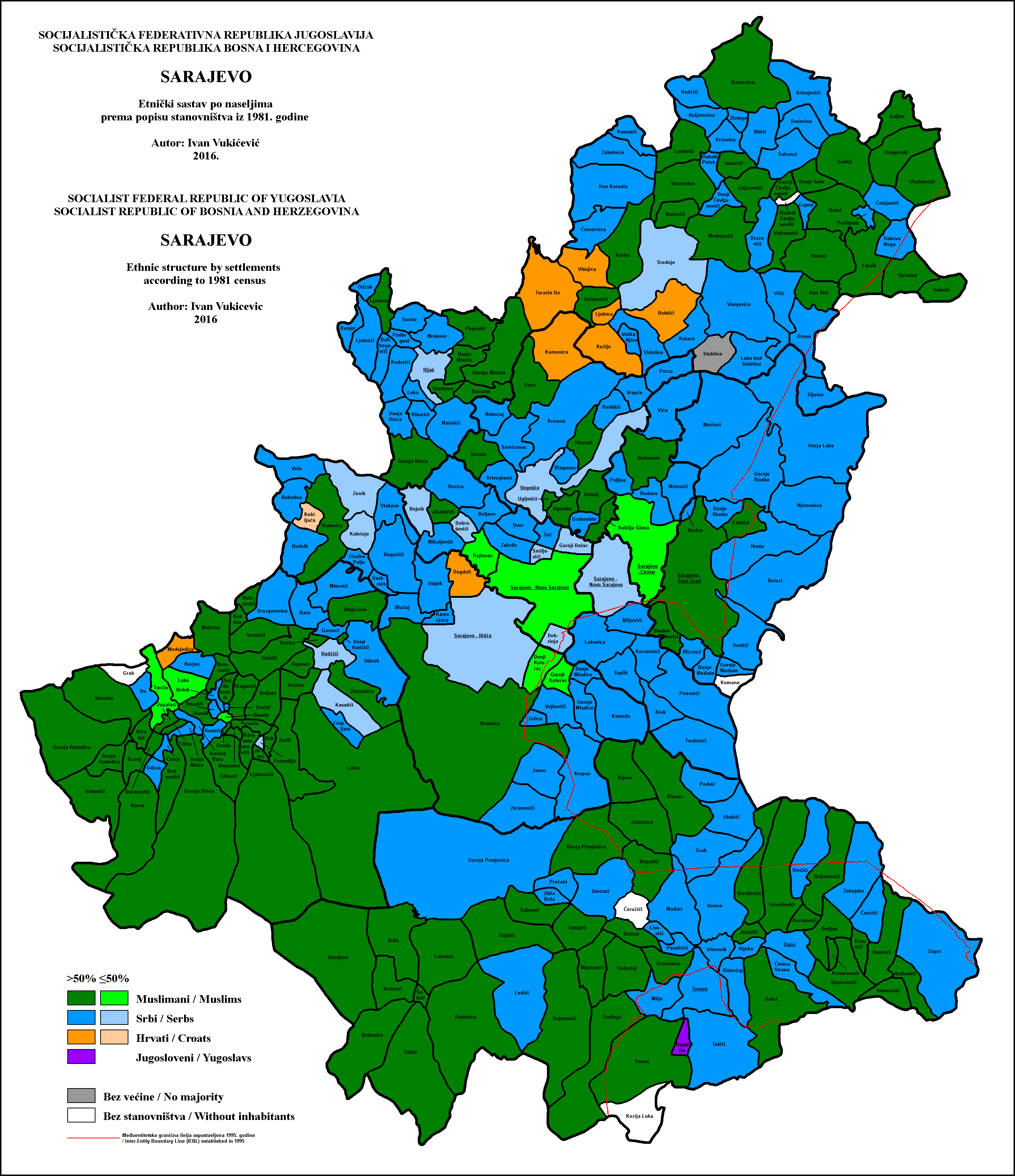
Ethnic structure of Sarajevo by settlements 1981

1991 census

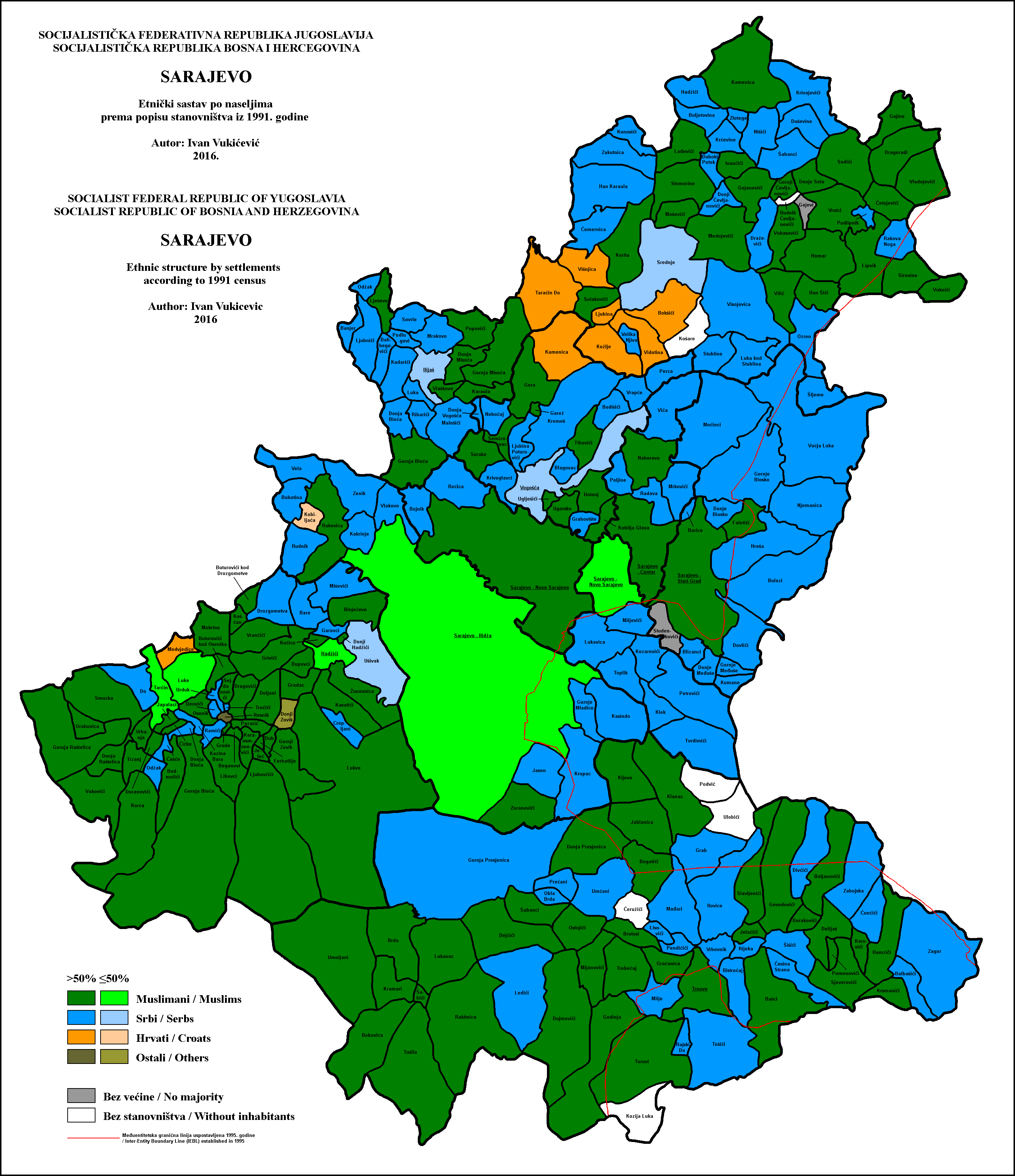
Ethnic structure of Sarajevo by settlements 1991

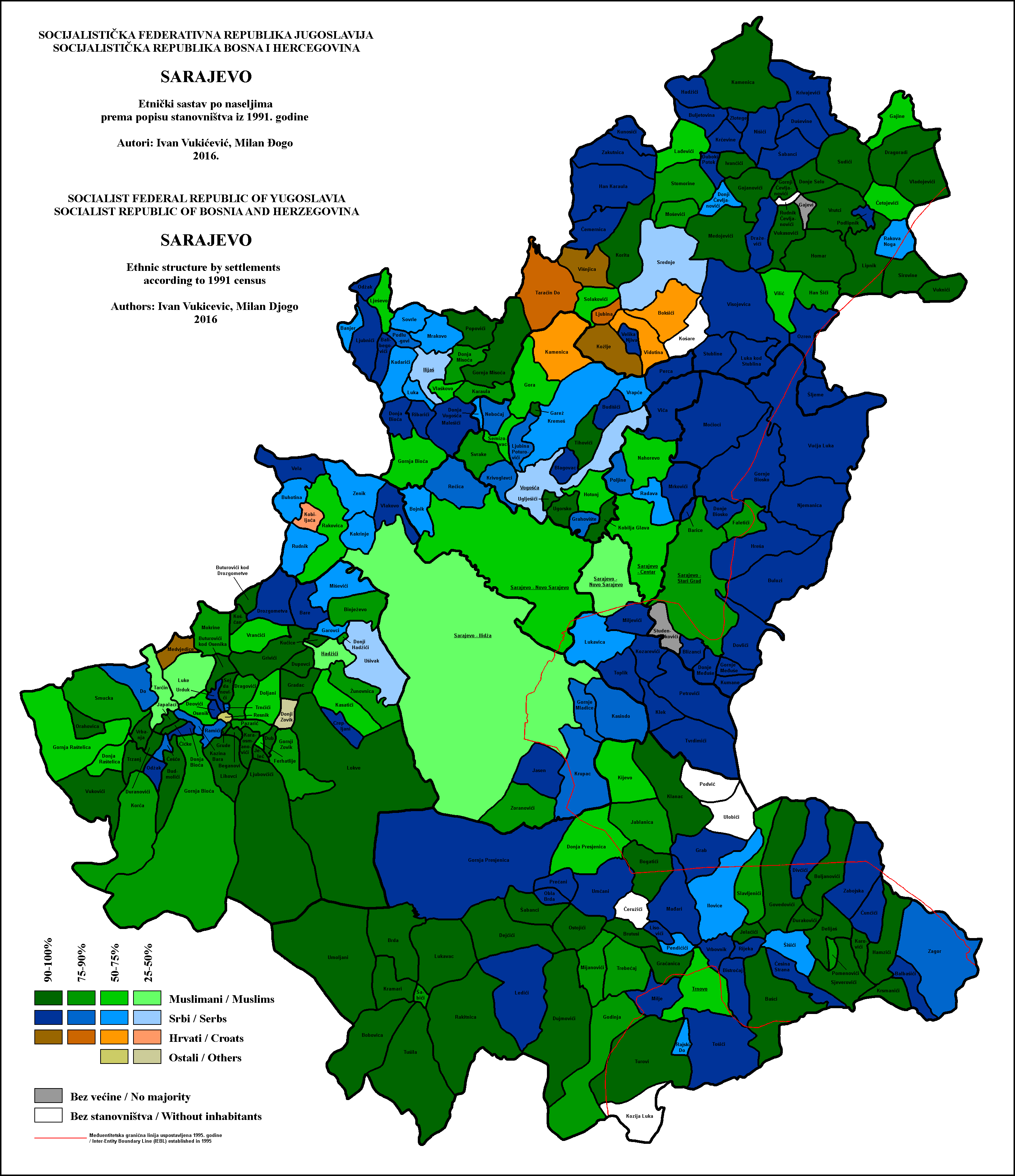
Ethnic structure of Sarajevo by settlements 1991

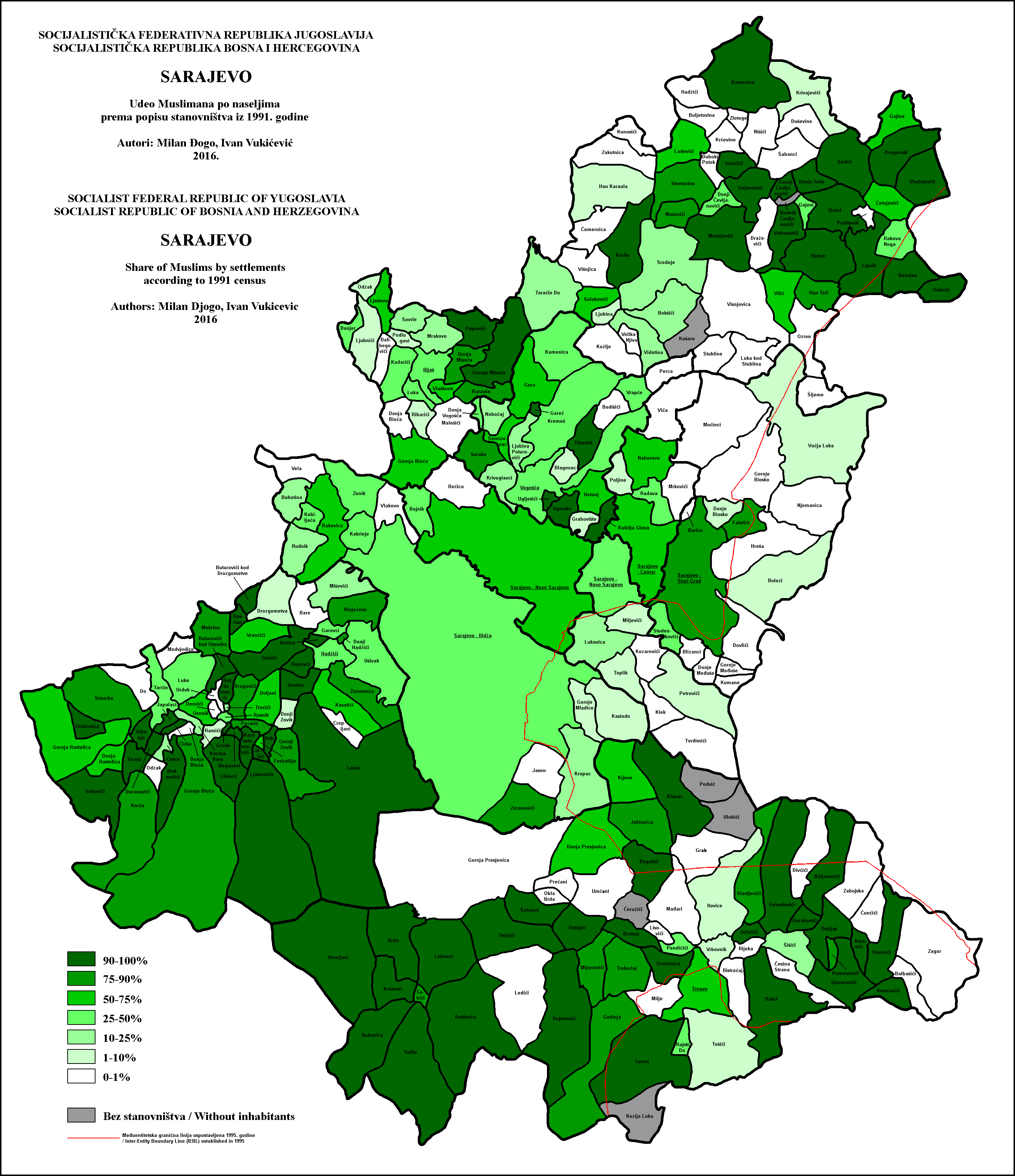
Share of ethnic Muslims in Sarajevo by settlements 1991

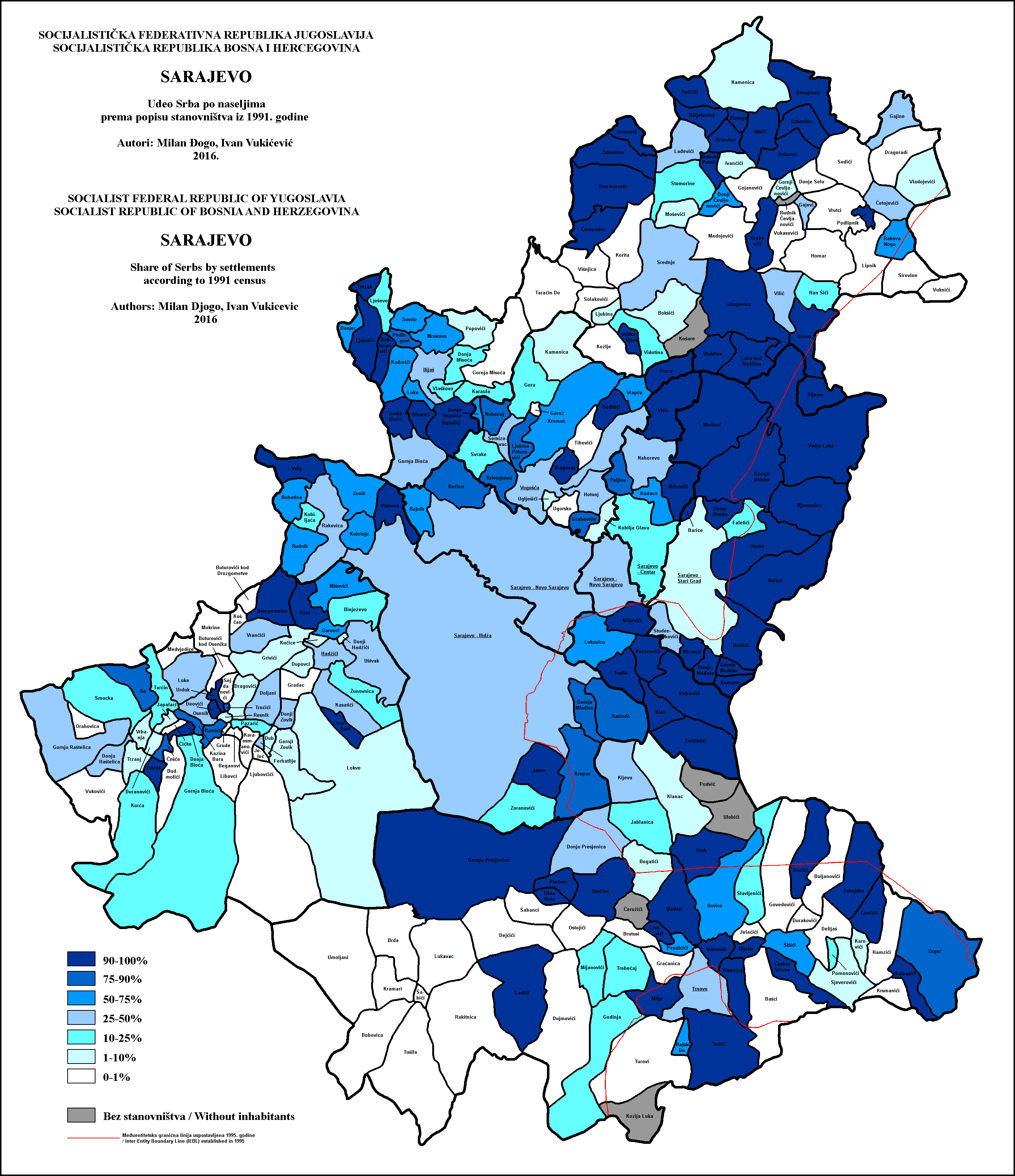
Share of Serbs in Sarajevo by settlements 1991

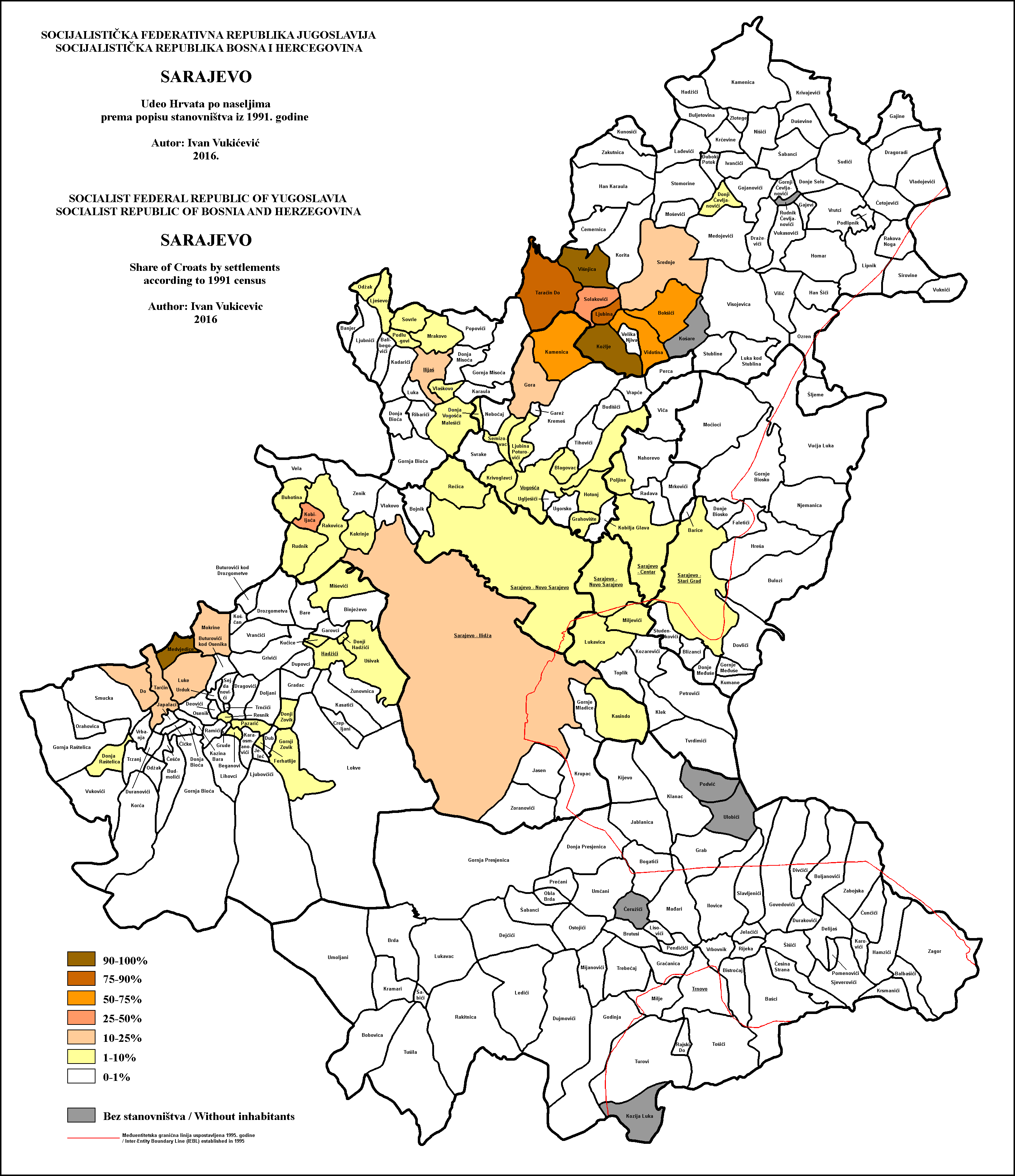
Share of Croats in Sarajevo by settlements 1991

2013 census

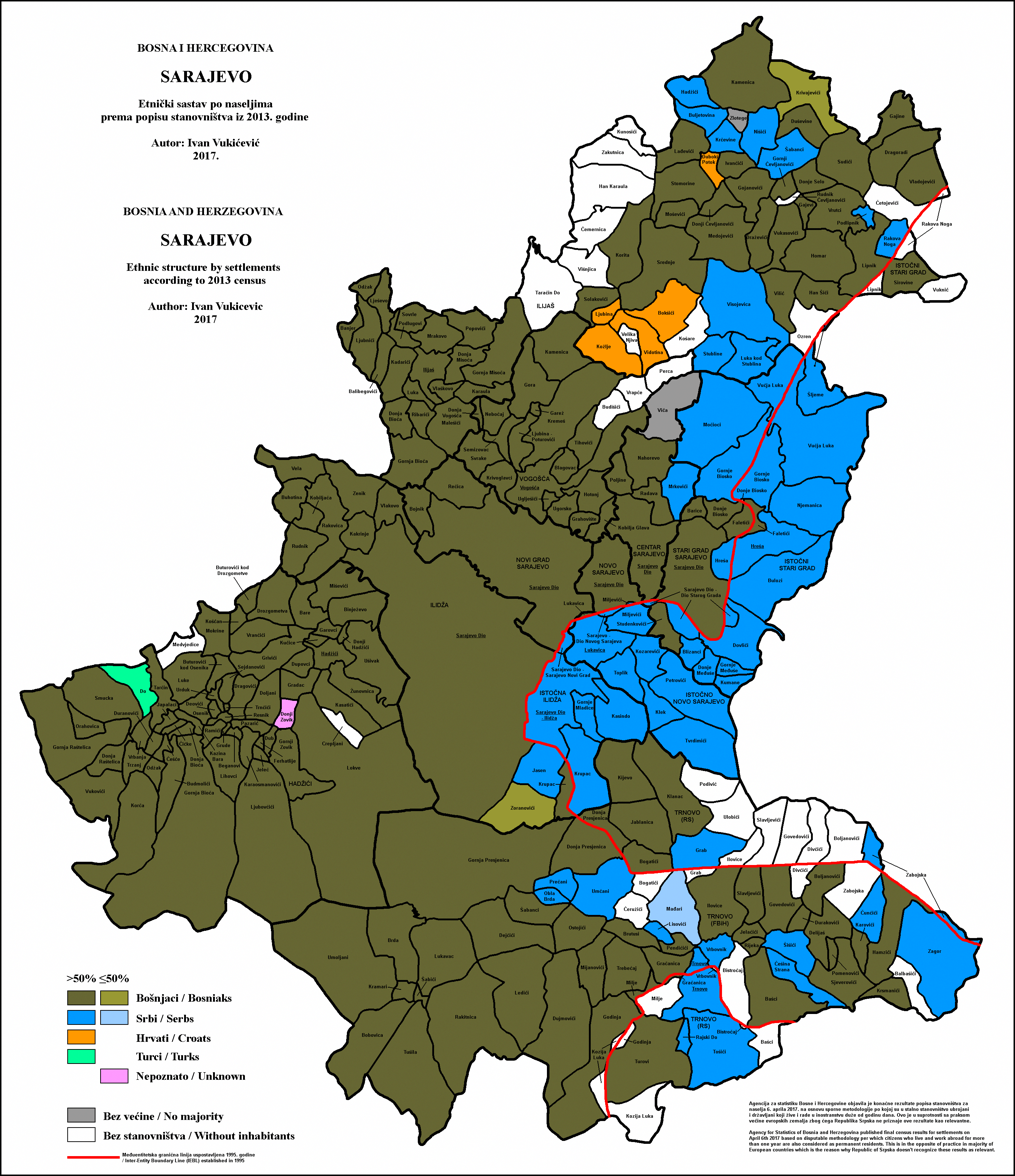
Ethnic structure of Sarajevo by settlements 2013

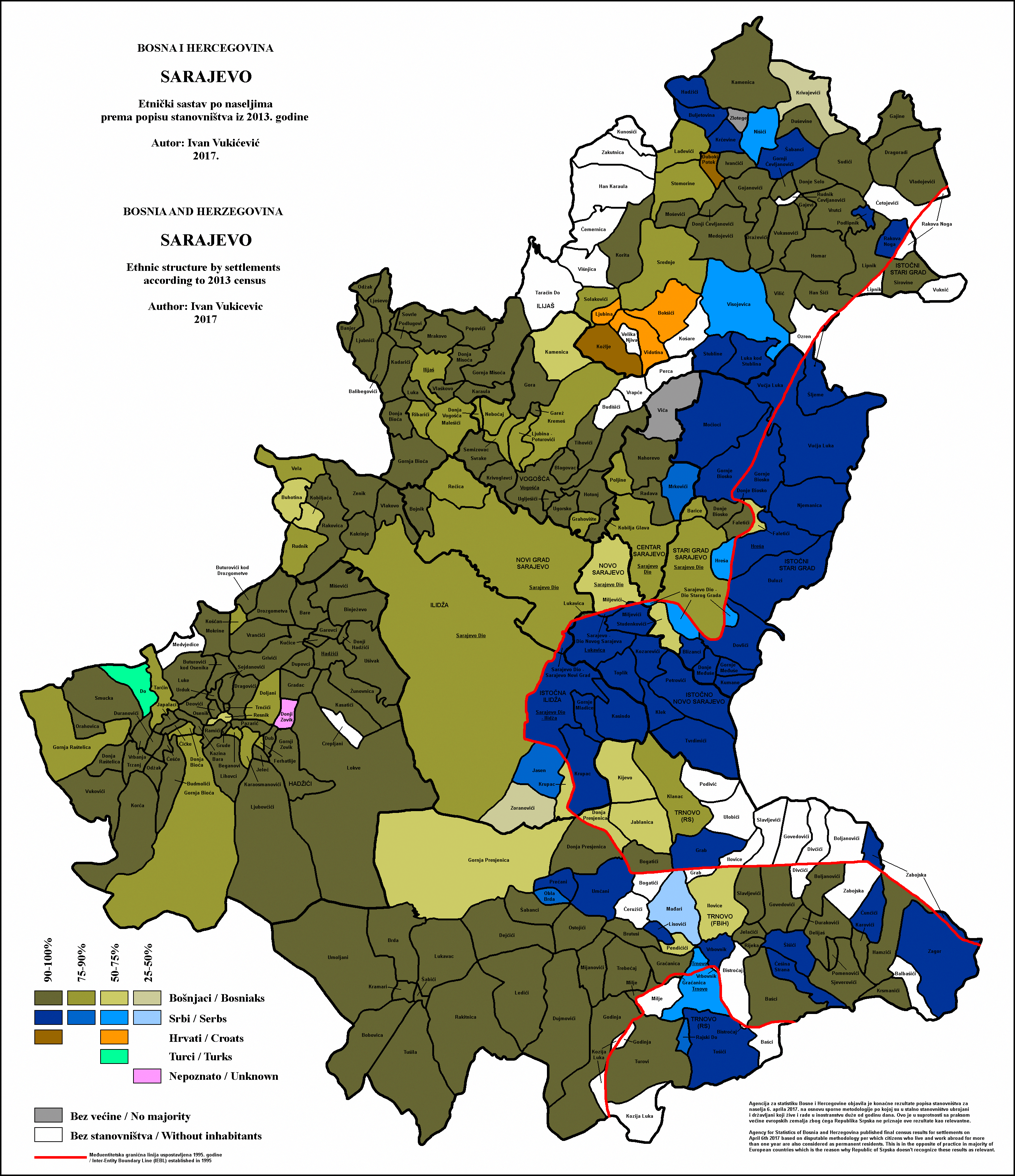
Ethnic structure of Sarajevo by settlements 2013

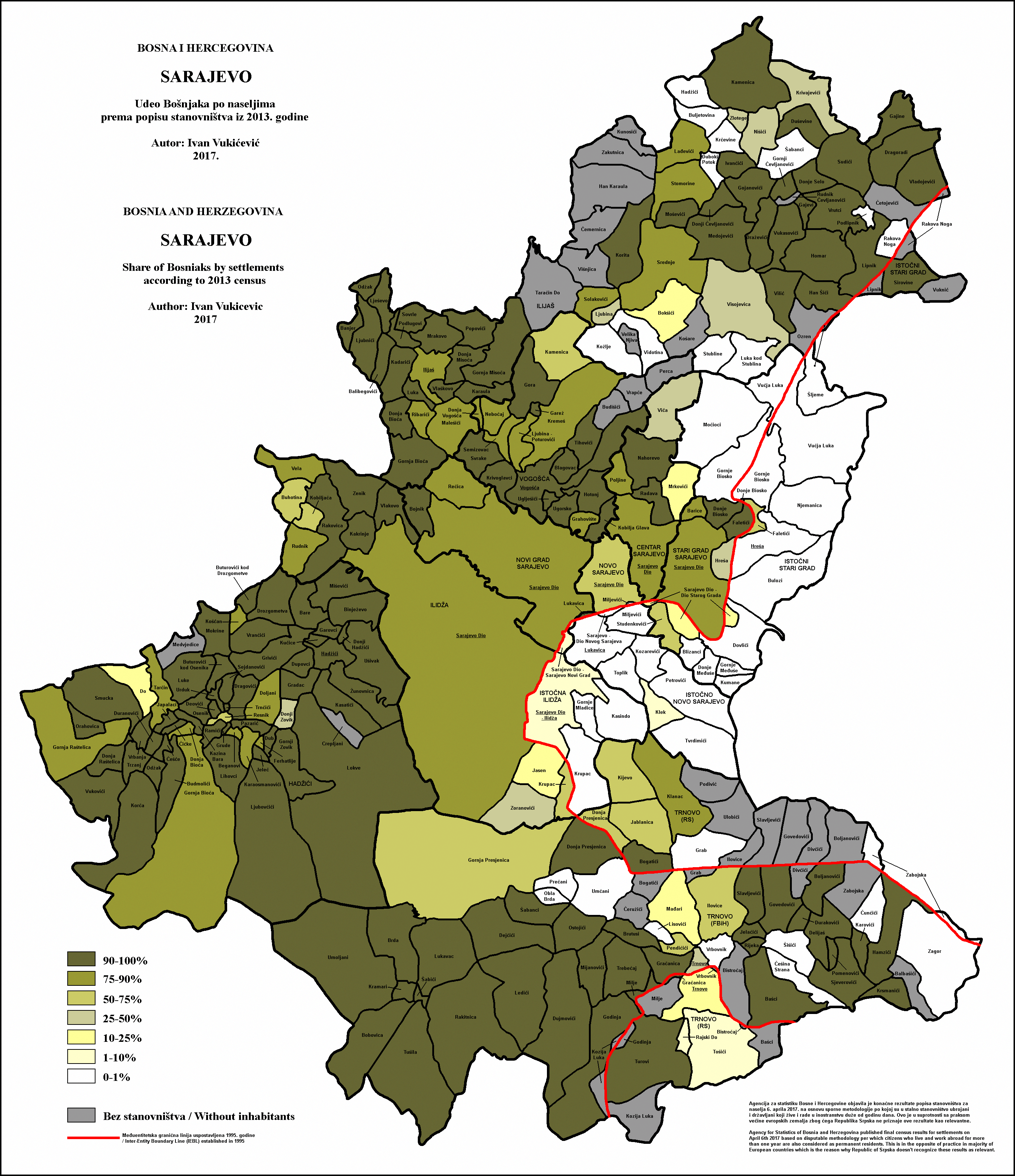
Share of Bosniaks in Sarajevo by settlements 2013

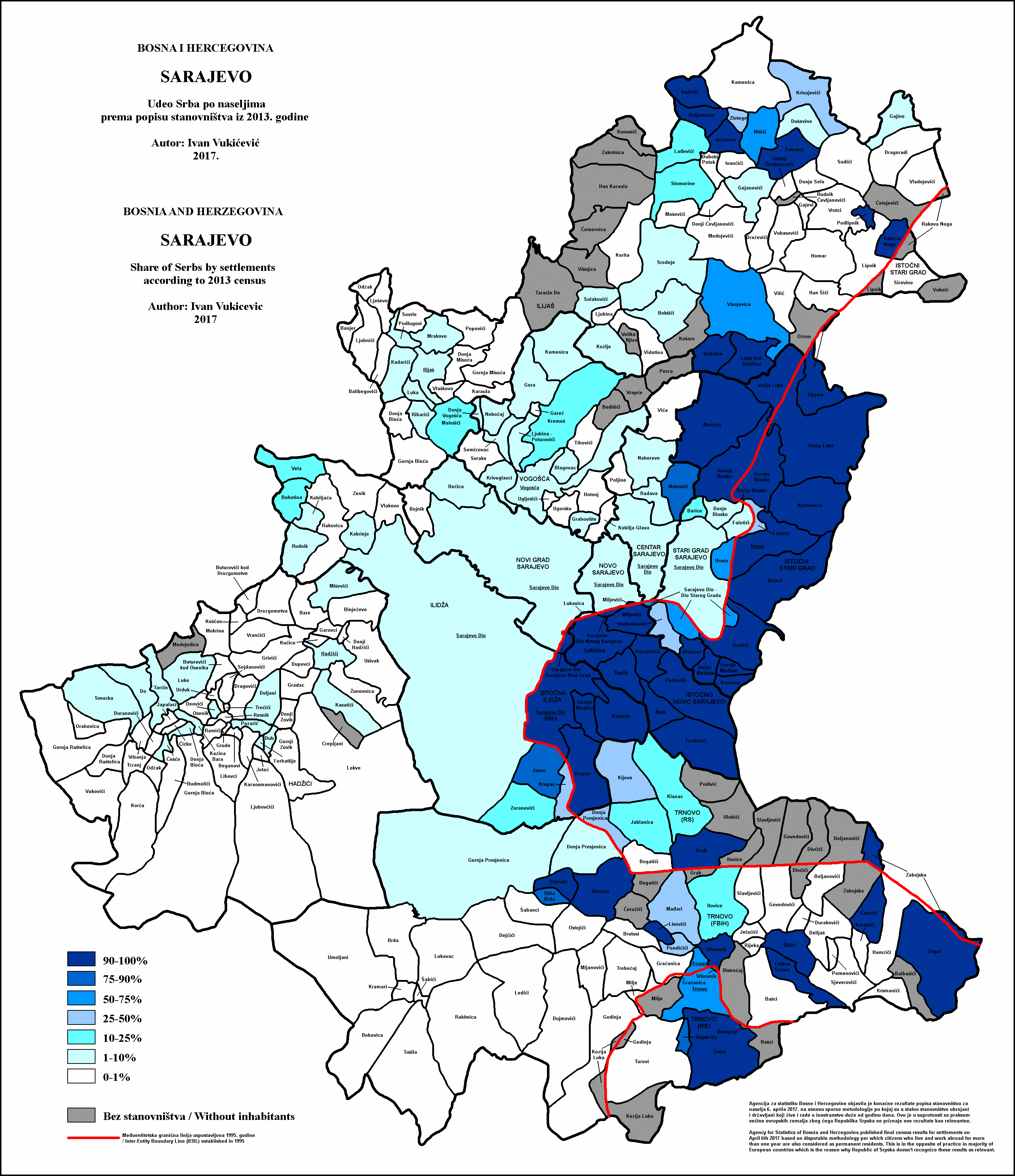
Share of Serbs in Sarajevo by settlements 2013

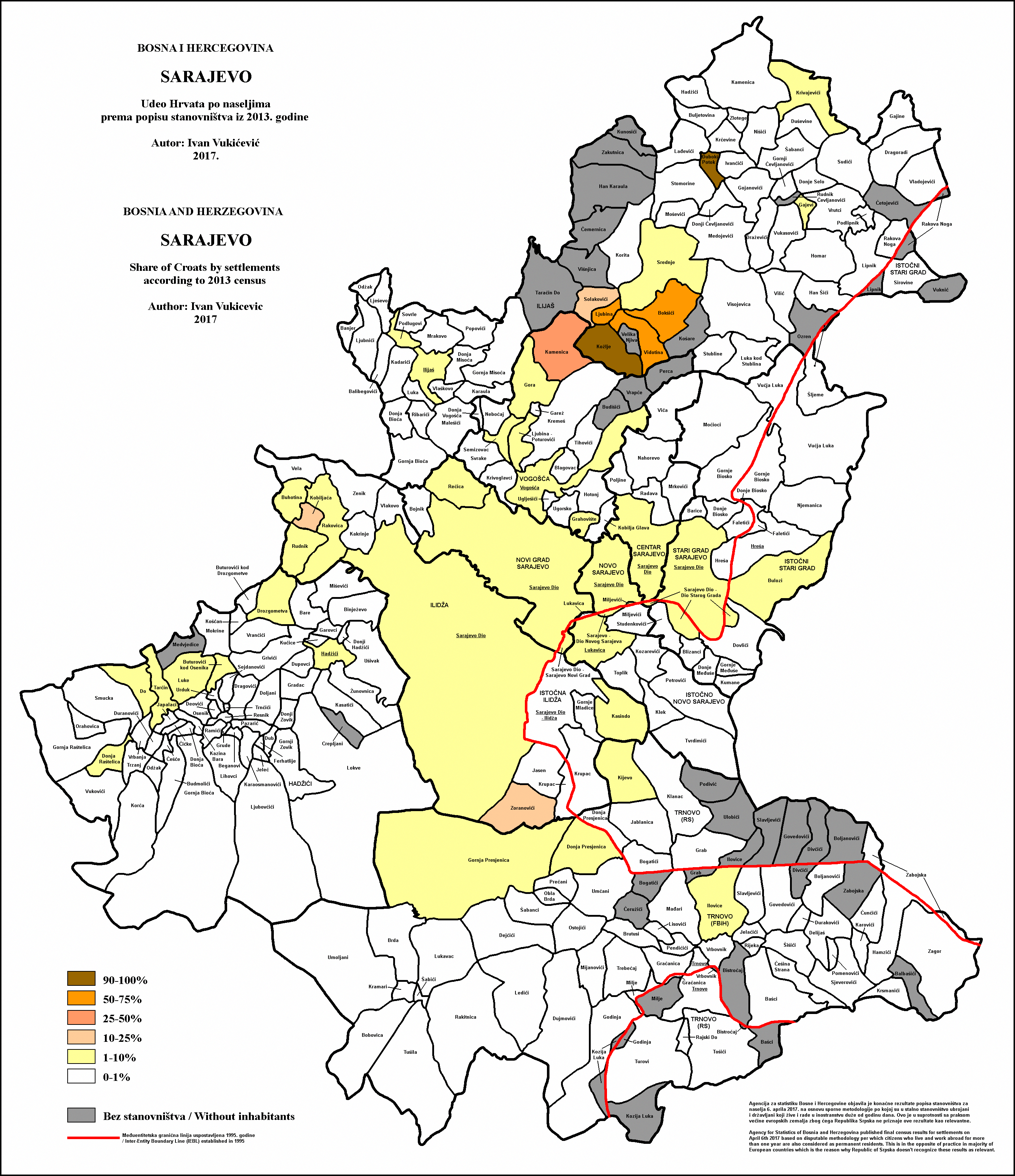
Share of Croats in Sarajevo by settlements 2013

== Bibliography ==
- McEvoy, Joanne; O'Leary, Brendan (22 April 2013). Power Sharing in Deeply Divided Places. University of Pennsylvania Press. ISBN 978-0-8122-0798-9.
- Ethnic composition of Bosnia-Herzegovina population, by municipalities and settlements, 1991. Census, Zavod za statistiku Bosne i Hercegovine – Bilten no. 234, Sarajevo. 1991.
