= Serbs of Sarajevo =

Traditional ethnic community in Sarajevo, Bosnia and Herzegovina

The Serbs of Sarajevo or Sarajevo Serbs, are one of traditional ethnic communities living in Sarajevo, capital and the largest city of Bosnia and Herzegovina.

== History ==
=== World War I ===
After the assassination of Archduke Franz Ferdinand of Austria, Anti-Serb rioting took place in Sarajevo on 28 and 29 June 1914, incited by Austro-Hungarian authorities. Two Serbs died and a total of fifty people were injured following the two-day rioting. Widespread looting emptied Serb-owned shops, homes, and warehouses of all goods and cash. The destruction dealt a devastating blow to Serb business and industry in Sarajevo, where, despite being a minority, Serbs had traditionally played a prominent role in trade, crafts, and manufacturing.

=== World War II ===
During World War II, Serbs living in the Independent State of Croatia, an Italian-German installed puppet state governed by the Croatian fascist Ustaše regime, were subjected to genocide. In the summer of 1941, Ustaše militia periodically interned and executed groups of Sarajevo Serbs. In August 1941, they arrested about one hundred Serbs suspected of ties to the resistance movements, mostly church officials and members of the intelligentsia, executing or deporting them to concentration camps. The Ustaše killed at least 323 people in the Villa Luburić, a slaughter house and place for torturing and imprisoning Serbs, Jews, and political dissidents.

=== Bosnian War ===
The first fatality of the Bosnian War is widely considered to be Nikola Gardović, an ethnic Serb from Sarajevo and the father of the groom, who was killed on 1 March 1992 when a Serb wedding procession in Sarajevo’s Baščaršija neighborhood was fired upon, with a Serbian Orthodox priest also wounded. The attack took place on the last day of a controversial referendum on Bosnia and Herzegovina's independence from Yugoslavia. Gardović, an ethnic Serb, is often regarded as the first casualty of the Bosnian war.

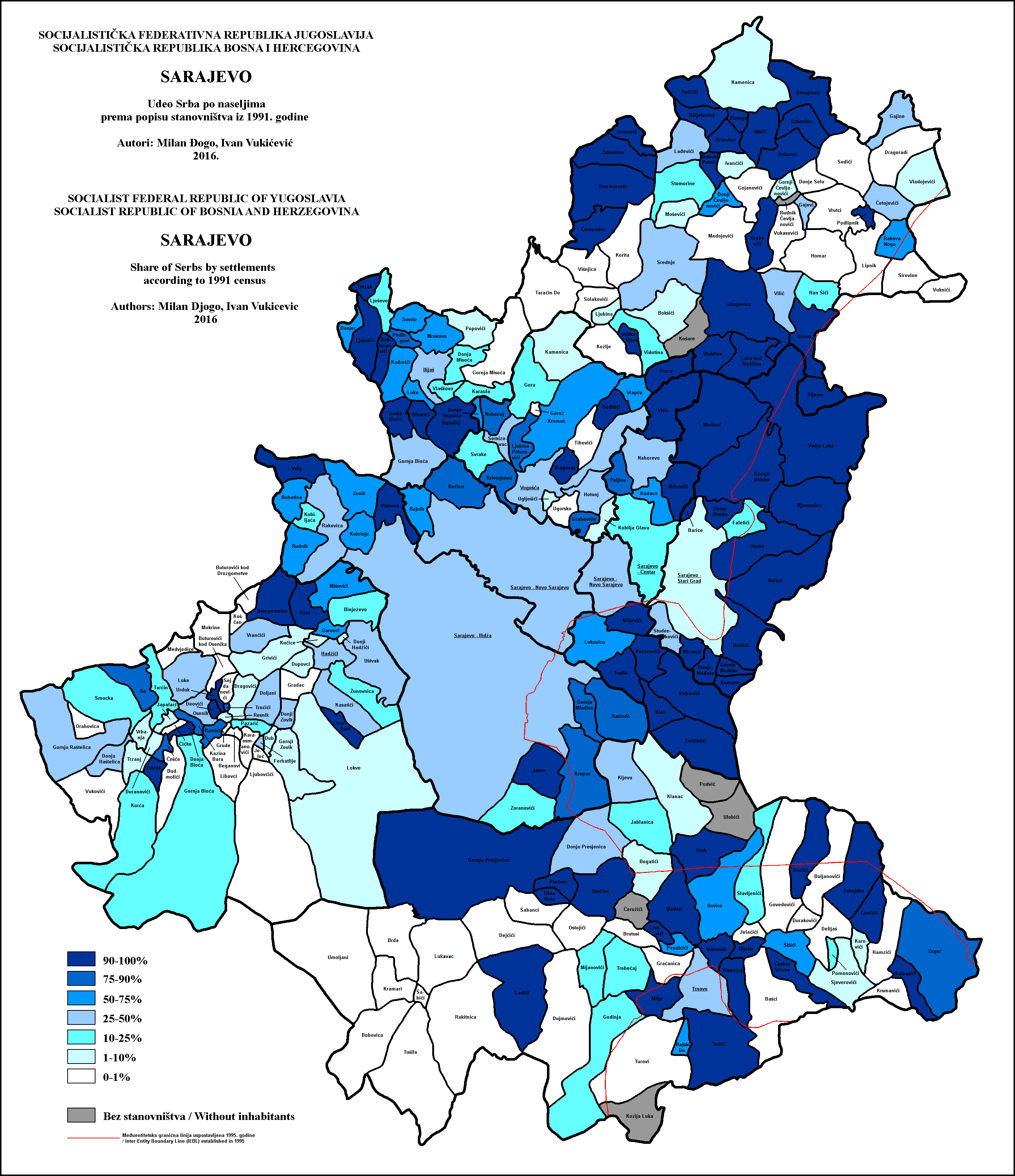
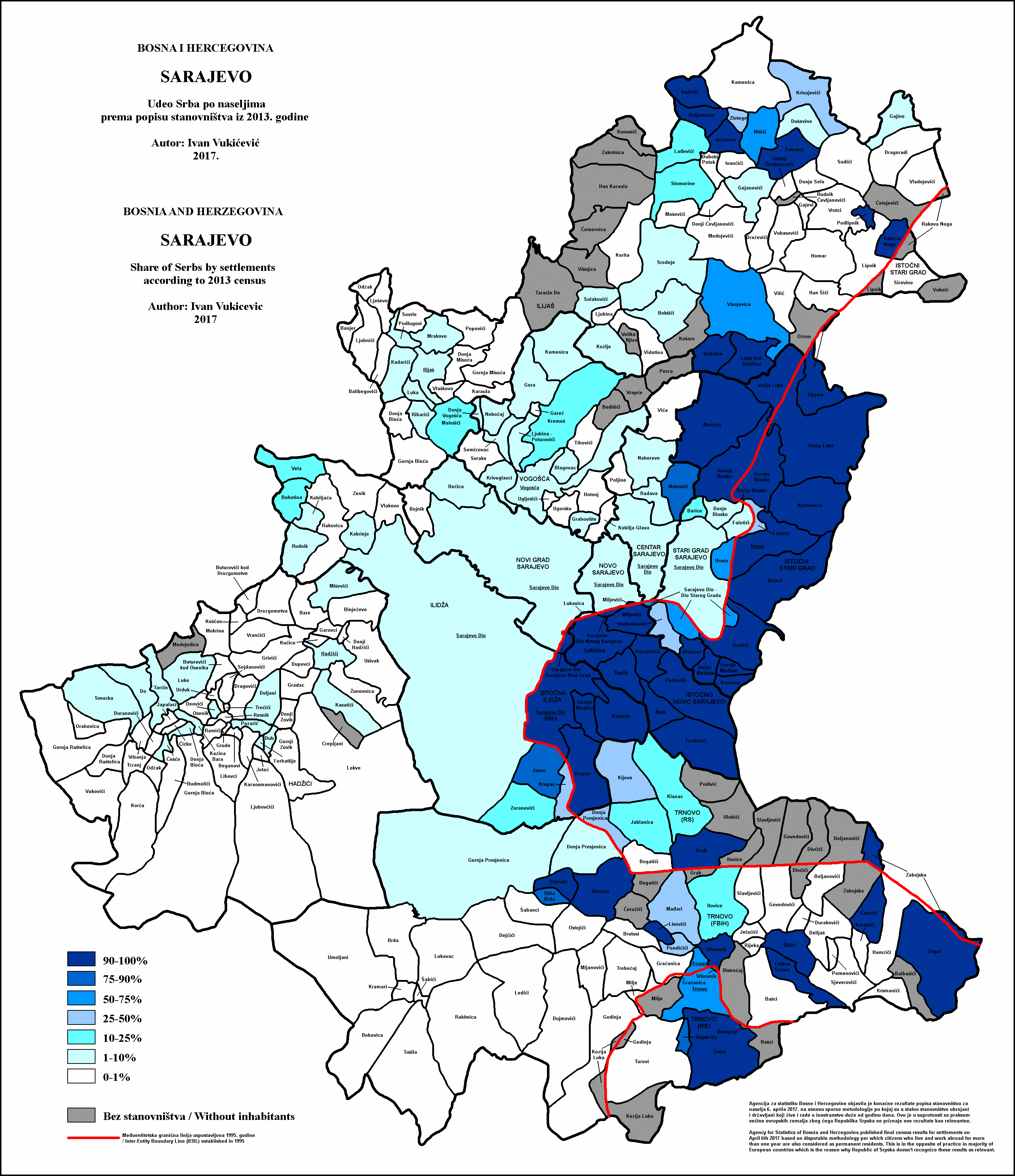
Share of Serbs in Sarajevo by settlements in 1991 (left) and 2013 (right)

During the siege of Sarajevo, Bosniak paramilitary leader Mušan Topalović and his forces abducted and killed mostly Serbs living in and around Sarajevo. A Kazani pit on the outskirts of the city was used as an execution site and a mass grave for Serbs who were rounded up, beaten and killed, sometimes by having their throats slit and decapitated. The total number of victims killed is not known, with estimates ranging from a few dozen to some hundreds. The actions of paramilitary units led many thousands of Serbs to flee the city, particularly in the summer of 1992. By war's end, the number of Serbs in Sarajevo was estimated to be less than one-fifth of those who had lived in the city before the outbreak of the war.

The Dayton Agreement that ended the war, finalized the administrative line between the Federation of Bosnia and Herzegovina and Republika Srpska, the two post-war territorial units of the country. The Sarajevo suburbs of Ilijaš, Vogošća, Hadžići, and Ilidža, as well as urban Grbavica neighborhood were incorporated into Federation, all being held by Bosnian Serb forces during the war. It was followed by mass exodus of ethnic Serbs in February and March 1996 from those neighborhoods and suburbs mainly to areas that were assigned to Republika Srpska or abroad. Their number was reported in 1996 as 62,000, with sources generally giving an estimate of between 60,000 and 70,000.

== Demographics ==
According to data from the 2013 census, number of ethnic Serbs in Sarajevo stood at 10,422, constituting 3.8% of city's population. Ethnic Serbs constituted almost a third of Sarajevo's population prior the Bosnian War. Following the war there was massive exodus of Serbs from the city in early 1996, with most displaced Serbs moved abroad (to Serbia or other countries) or to Istočno Sarajevo, a newly-built town on the outskirts of Sarajevo, located in Republika Srpska.

== Heritage ==
Sarajevo is the seat of the Metropolitanate of Dabar and Bosnia of the Serbian Orthodox Church. There are three main Serbian Orthodox churches in Sarajevo: the Church of the Holy Archangels Michael and Gabriel, also known as the "Old Orthodox Church", dating back to the 16th century, the Cathedral of the Nativity of the Theotokos, also known as the "Cathedral Church", built in the 1860s, and the Church of the Holy Transfiguration.

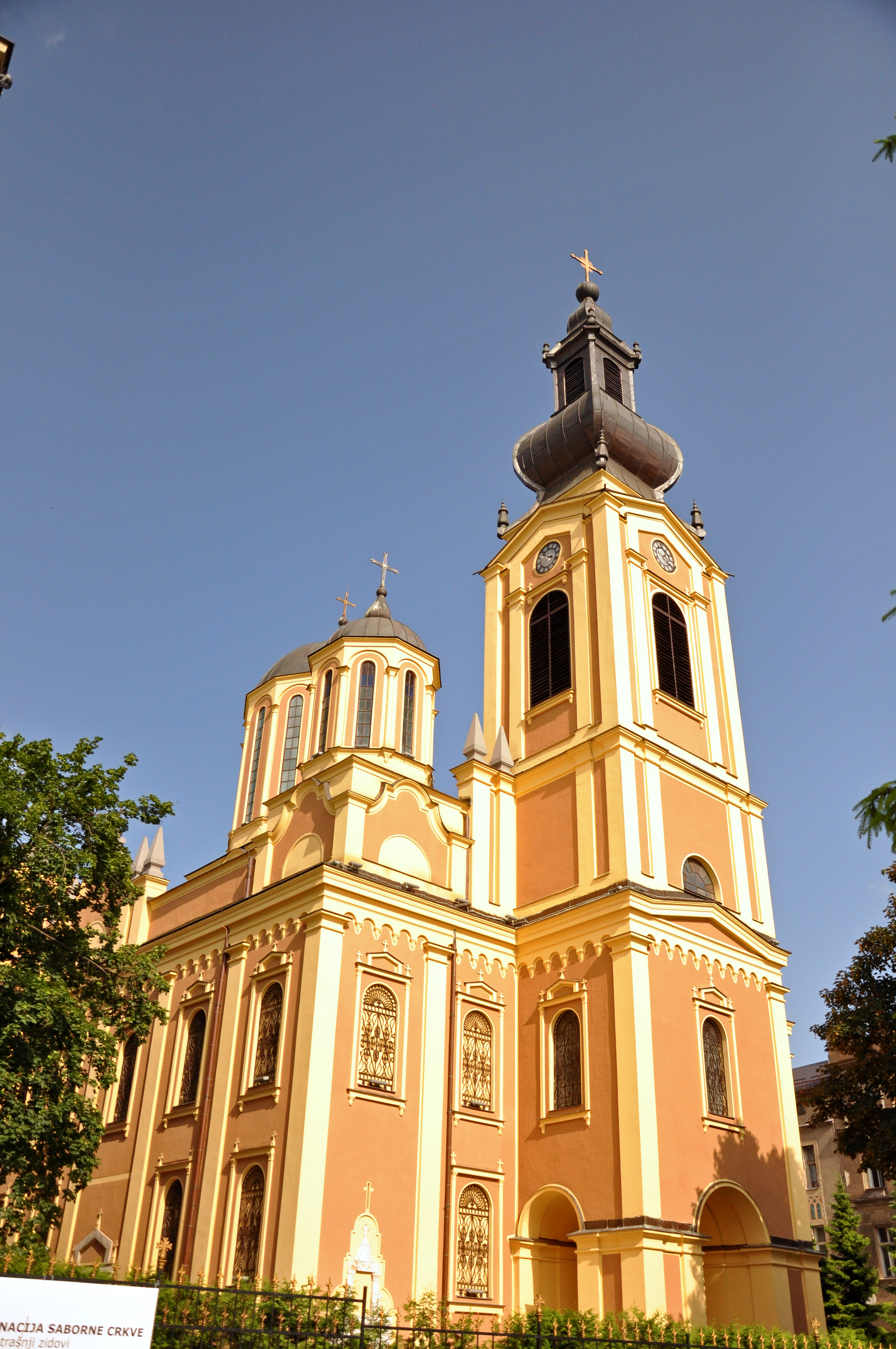
Cathedral of the Nativity of the Theotokos

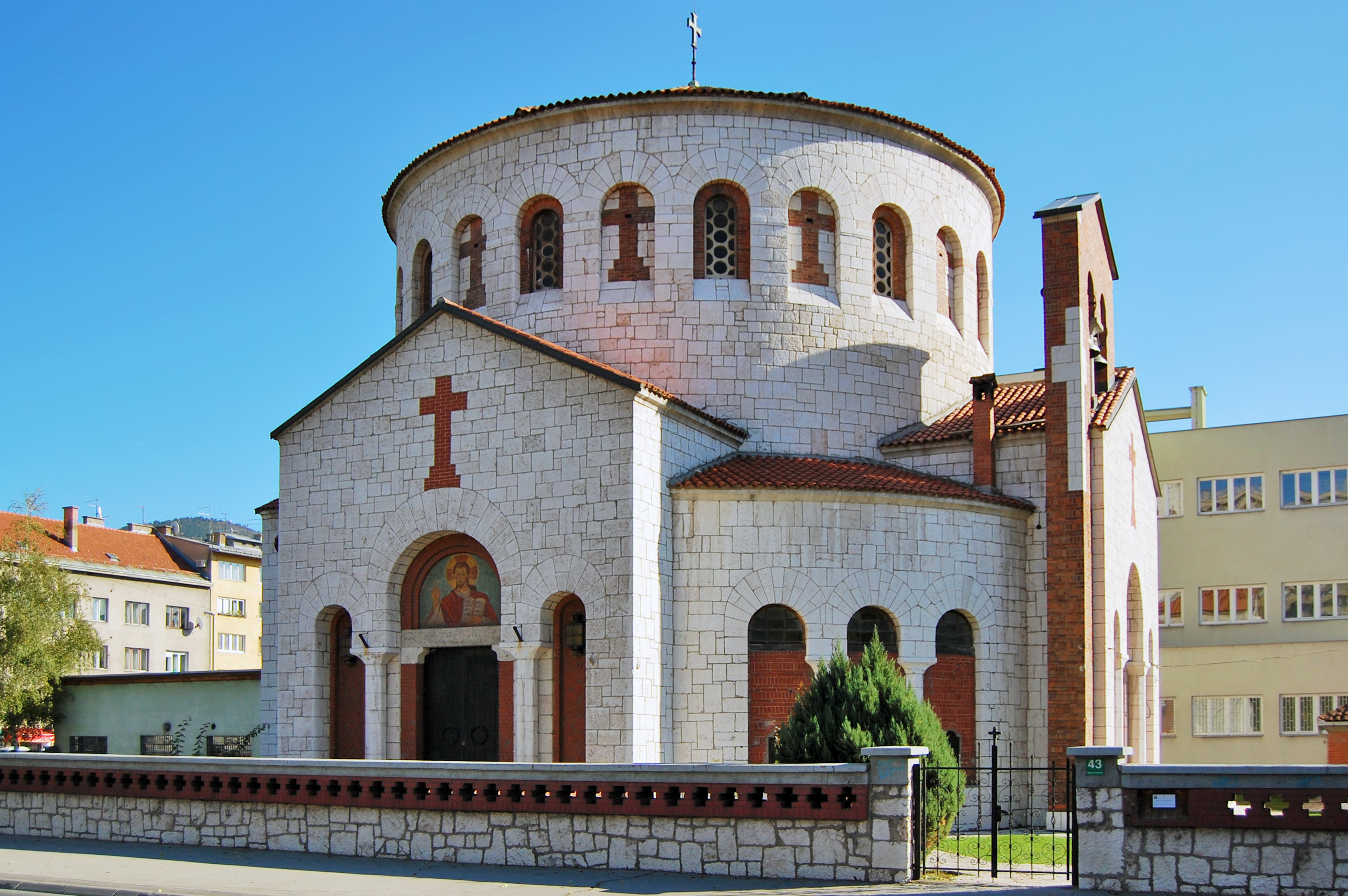
Church of the Holy Transfiguration

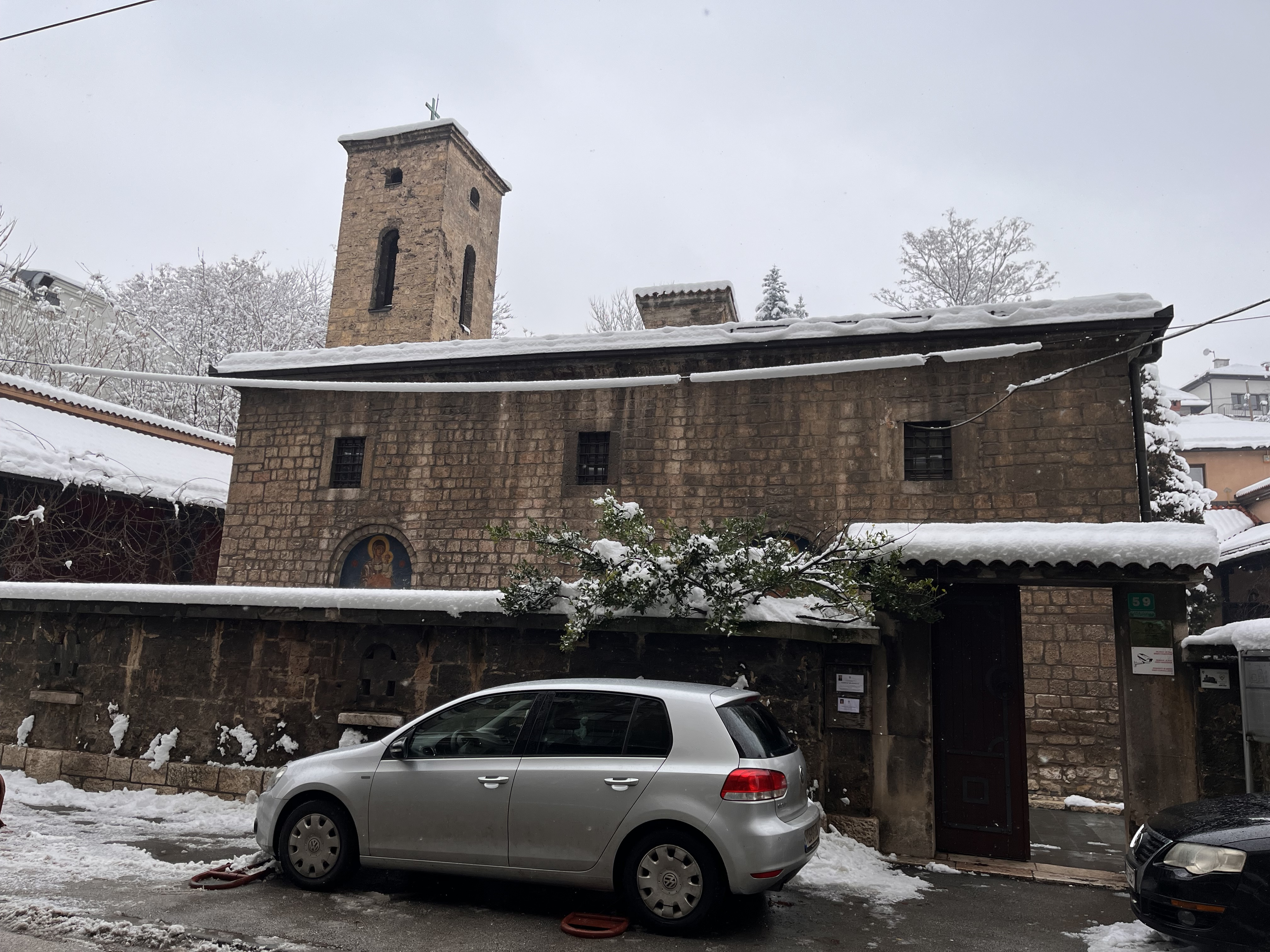
Church of the Holy Archangels Michael and Gabriel

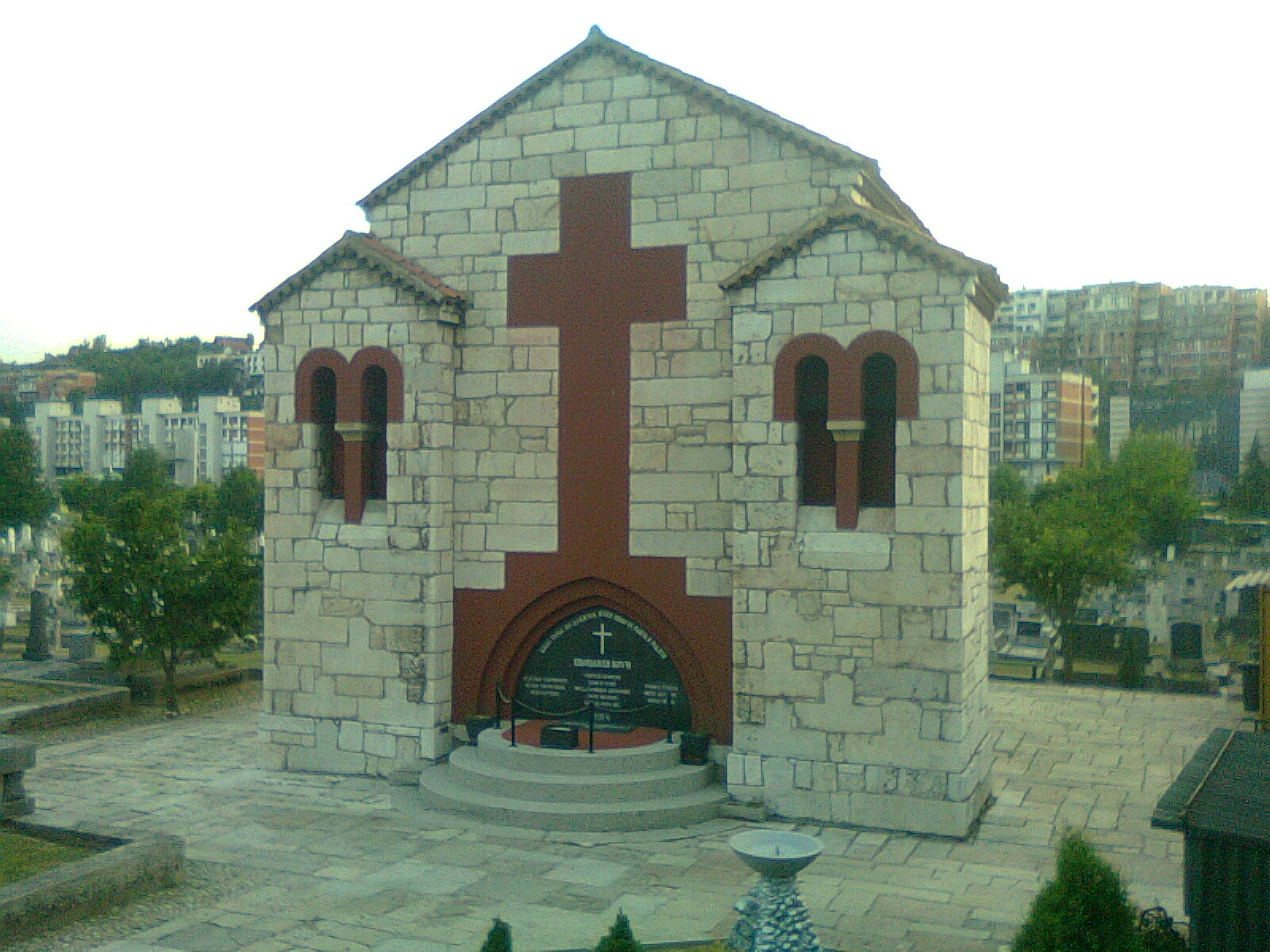
Vidovdan Heroes Chapel

== Notable people ==
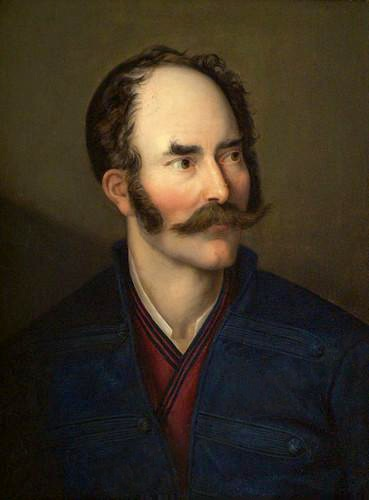
Sima Milutinović Sarajlija

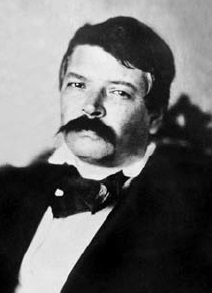
Jovan Marinović

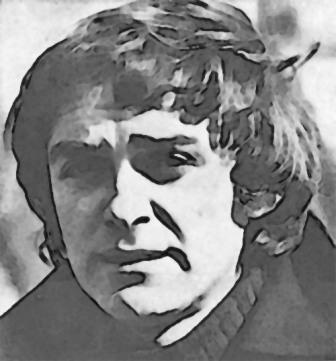
Momo Kapor

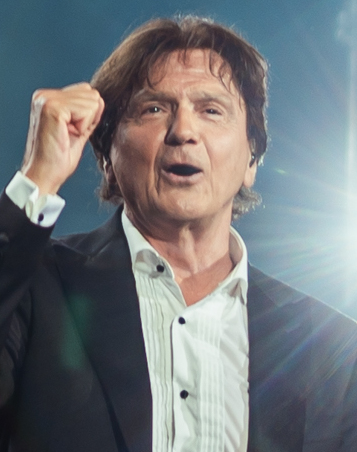
Zdravko Čolić

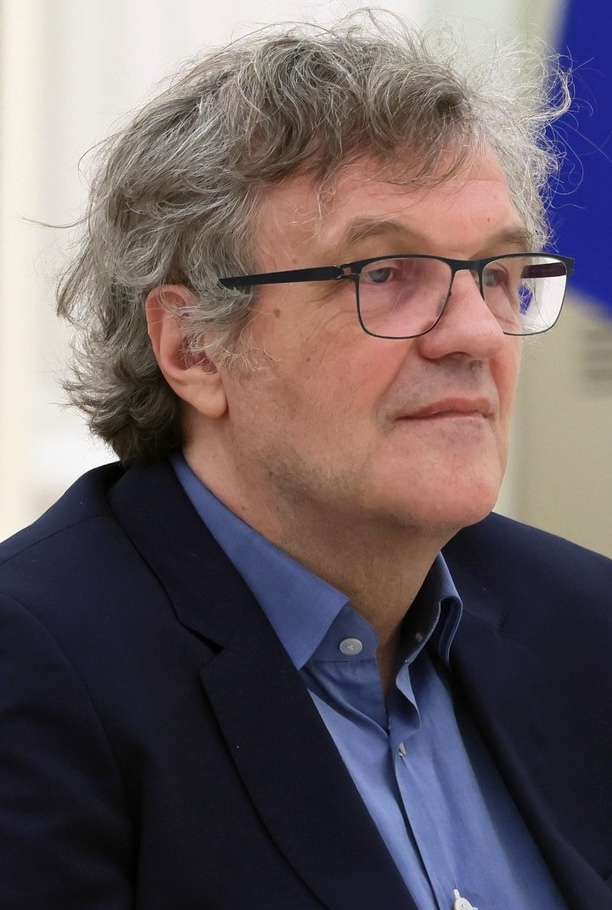
Emir Kusturica

- Ognjen Aškrabić, basketball player
- Dimitrije Bjelica – chess player
- Isidora Bjelica – writer
- Rade Bogdanović – football player
- Blagoje Bratić – football player and football coach
- Vesna Caselotti – chess player
- Vlado Čapljić – football player
- Vladimir Savčić Čobi – singer
- Zdravko Čolić – singer
- Goran Bregović – composer
- Predrag Danilović – basketball player
- Braco Dimitrijević – artist
- Dara Dragišić – Yugoslav Partisan
- Boro Drašković – playwright and film director
- Milorad Ekmečić – historian
- Predrag Golubović – film director
- Trifko Grabež – Young Bosnia revolutionary
- Hieromartyr Petar – Dabar-Bosnia Metropolitan bishop
- Danilo Ilić – Young Bosnia revolutionary
- Ipe Ivandić – musician
- Gligorije Jeftanović – merchant and industrialist
- Momo Kapor – writer
- Nele Karajlić – singer and actor
- Stanko Luka Karaman – biologist
- Nikola T. Kašiković – writer and publisher
- Nenad Kecmanović – scholar
- Ljubo Kojo – mayor of Sarajevo
- Nikola Koljević – scholar and politician
- Srđan Koljević – screenwriter and film director
- Ognjen Koroman – football player
- Dragutin Kosovac – post-war communist politician
- Momčilo Krajišnik – politician
- Simo Krunić – football player and manager
- Emir Kusturica – film director
- Željko Lukajić – basketball coach
- Dane Maljković – mayor of Sarajevo
- Dragan Marinković Maca – actor
- Jovan Marinović – politician, Prime Minister of Serbia
- Lazo Materić – mayor of Sarajevo
- Nikola Milošević – philosopher
- Aleksandar Aca Nikolić – basketball coach
- Nebojša Novaković – football player and manager
- Predrag Palavestra – writer
- Predrag Pašić – football player
- Veselin Petrović – basketball player
- Vladimir Pištalo – writer
- Biljana Plavšić – biologist and politician
- Slobodan Seljo Princip – Yugoslav Partisan
- Vaso Radić – mayor of Sarajevo
- Milanko Renovica – communist politician
- Sima Milutinović Sarajlija – poet
- Vladislav Skarić – historian, geographer, and academic
- Ljiljana Smajlović – journalist
- Branko Stanković – football player and football coach
- Vojislav Šešelj – politician
- Ognjen Tadić – politician
- Mladen Vojičić Tifa – singer
- Milić Vukašinović – musician

== See also ==
- Serbs of Bosnia and Herzegovina
- Serbs of Mostar
- Metropolitanate of Dabar and Bosnia
