= Exodus of Sarajevo Serbs =

Migration of ethnic Serbs following the end of the Bosnian War

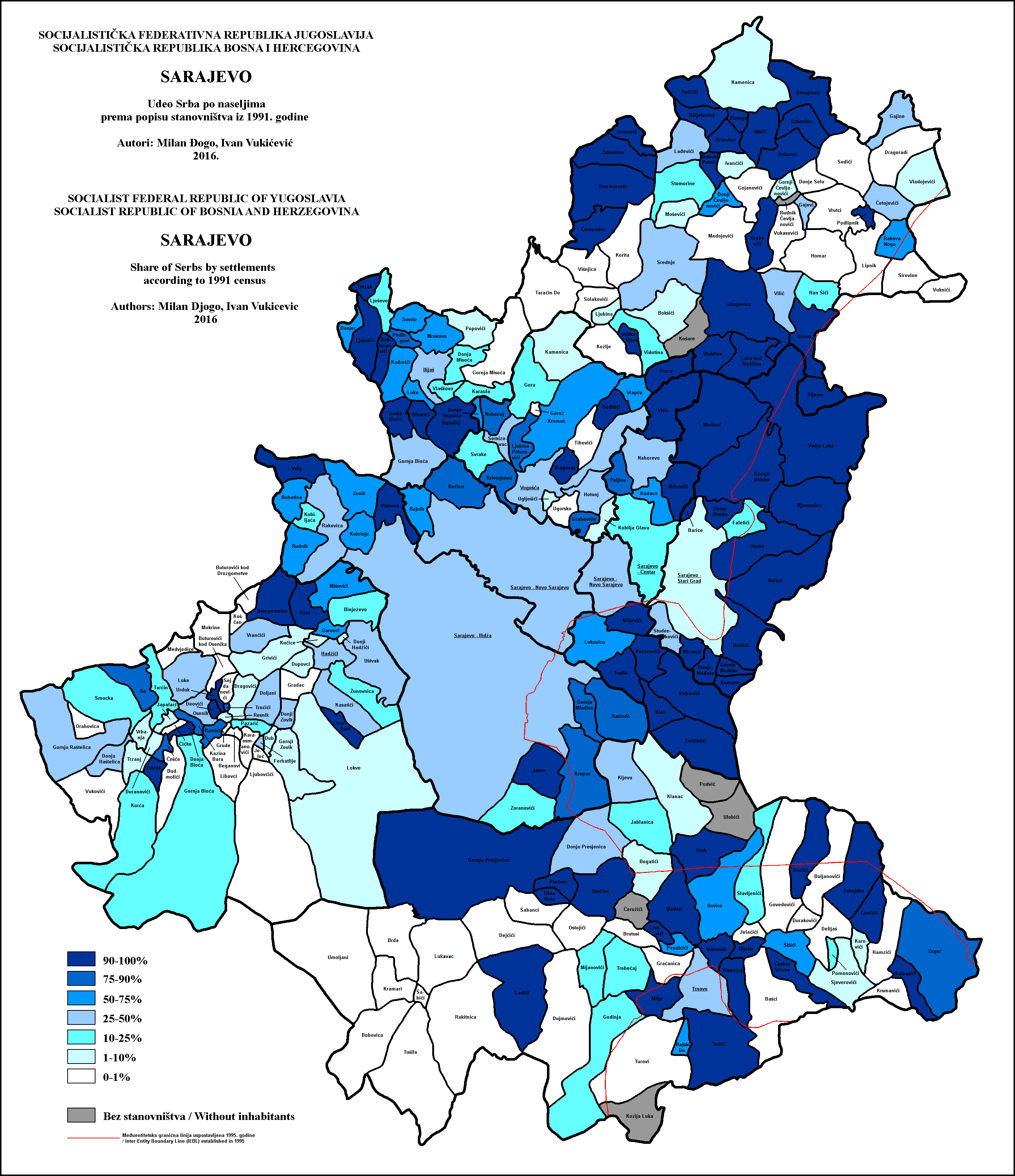
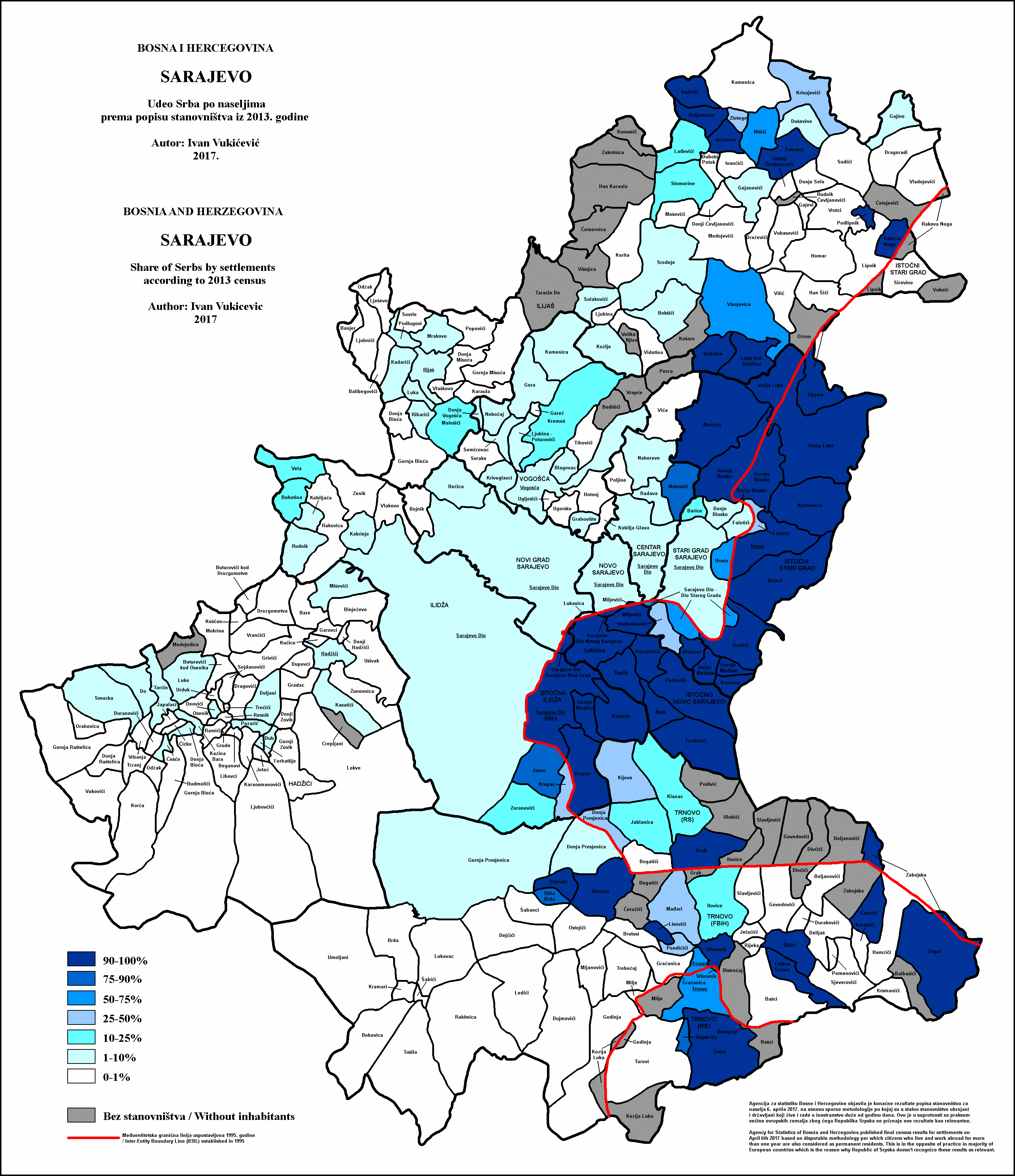
Pre- and post-war census data.

The Exodus of Sarajevo Serbs was the migration of ethnic Serbs from Sarajevo, the capital of Bosnia and Herzegovina, between January and March 1996 after the Dayton Agreement that concluded the Bosnian War (1992–95).

== Background ==
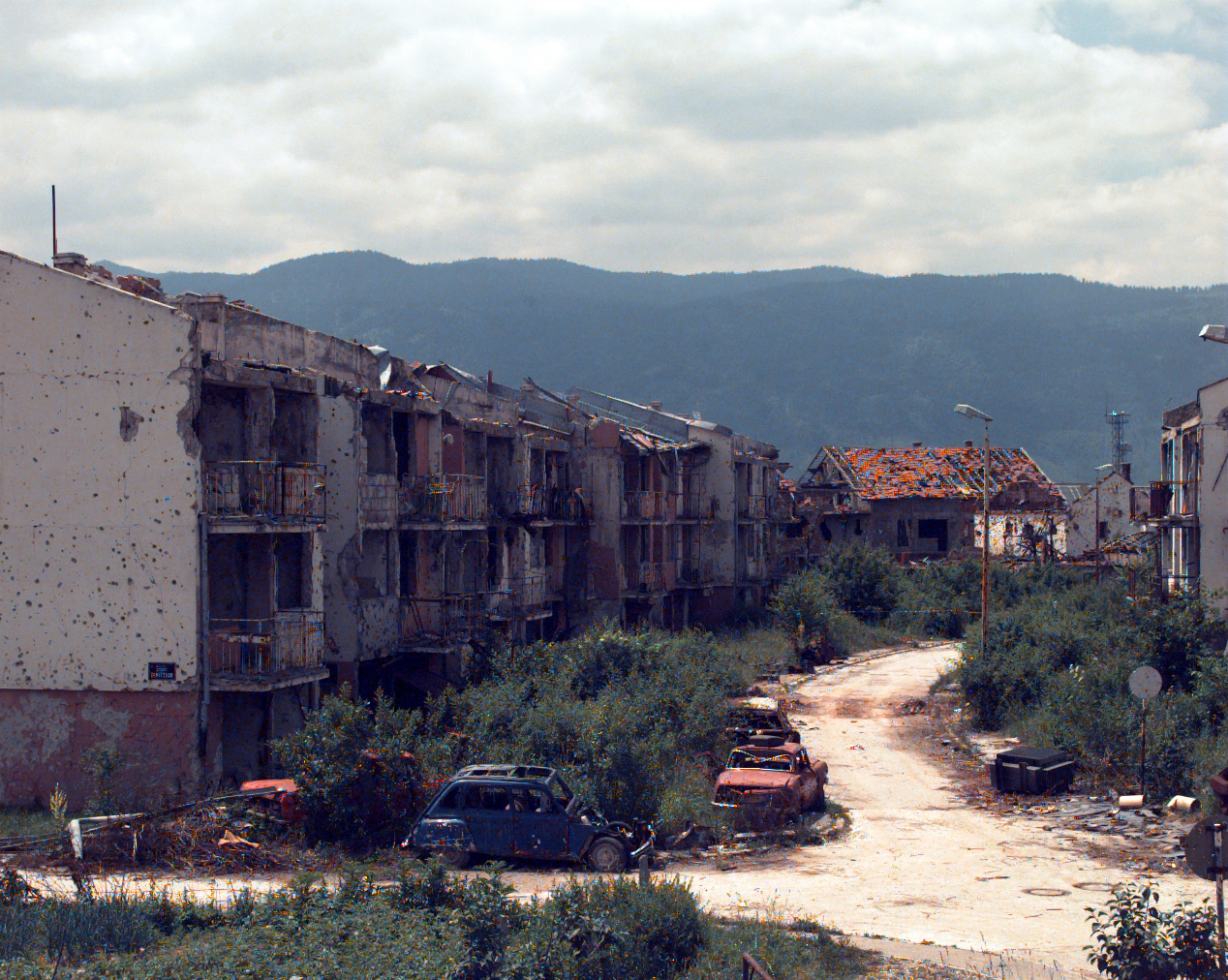
Destroyed housing units in Sarajevo, 1996

Following Slovenia and Croatia's secession from the Yugoslav Federation on June 25, 1991, the political leaders of the ethnically mixed Bosnia and Herzegovina were divided on the configuration of the state. In October 1991, the Bosnian Croat and Bosniak members of the parliament of the Socialist Republic of Bosnia and Herzegovina in Sarajevo passed a 'memorandum on sovereignty and neutrality' causing protest from Bosnian Serb leaders who walked out of the assembly. Most Bosnian Croats and Bosniaks favored independence while Bosnian Serbs preferred Bosnia to stay in Yugoslavia; in March 1992, a European Community-backed Bosnian referendum was held that was boycotted by Bosnian Serbs, in which 99.7 percent voted for independence. Following the referendum, violent skirmishes broke out and Sarajevo was closed off in barricades by Bosnian Serb activists. War broke out after the European recognition of Bosnia's independence on 6 April 1992.

After it was initially besieged by the forces of the Yugoslav People's Army, the city was then besieged by the Army of Republika Srpska. Lasting from 5 April 1992 to 29 February 1996, it was the longest siege of a capital city in the history of modern warfare. The siege was marred by atrocities against the civilian population. Attacks caused significant damage to the city's buildings and infrastructure. A total of 13,952 people were killed during the siege, including 5,434 civilians. The war ended after NATO conducted air strikes against Bosnian Serb positions in August 1995, which led to peace talks and the signing of the Dayton Accords in December 1995, creating the Serb republic (Republika Srpska) as an entity within the Federation of Bosnia and Herzegovina. The Bosnian government officially declared an end to the siege of Sarajevo on 29 February 1996, when Bosnian Serb forces left positions in and around the city.

== Exodus ==
The Dayton Agreement finalized the demarcation between the Federation of Bosnia and Herzegovina (FBiH) and Republika Srpska (RS), the two post-war entities of the country. The Sarajevo suburbs of Ilijaš, Vogošća, Hadžići, Ilidža, and Grbavica were incorporated into Federation, while other peripheral parts of the former Sarajevo municipality became part of RS (see Istočno Sarajevo). The five areas had been held by Bosnian Serbs during the war. The Serb community massively left the Bosnian government-controlled part of Sarajevo for Republika Srpska. Their number was reported in 1996 as 62,000, with sources generally giving an estimate of between 60,000 and 70,000.

The exodus of Sarajevo Serbs was one of many exoduses of Serbs during Bosnian War. Right before this exodus there was another exodus of 17,000 Serbs from Odžak. Both of them were preceded by massive exodus of 200,000 Serbs from Croatia during Operation Storm which set precedents for the exodus of Sarajevo Serbs. It was reported on 1 January 1996 that 'rumours and blind panic trigger mass flight from [the] city's contested suburbs'.

Australian-Bosnian professor Dino Murtic emphasized that exodus of Sarajevo Serbs was massive and planned and that Bosnian president Izetbegović initially demonstrated indifference about it stating that the people of Sarajevo "finally deserved to be free of their murderers". After some time, Izetbegović called Serbs to stay in Sarajevo.

Some Serbs exhumated the graves of their ancestors from Sarajevo graveyards to graveyards near their new accommodation.

== Responsibility ==
The Institute for War and Peace Reporting reported that all involved parties in Bosnia were responsible for the mass exodus of Sarajevo Serbs, including the officials of Republika Srpska. It was difficult to determine if this exodus was voluntarily or coerced. According to N. Chakravartty, the exodus of Serbs from Croatia during Operation Storm (silently supported by major powers like United States and Germany) set precedent for the exodus of 150,000 terrified suburban Sarajevo Serbs who did not feel that a Muslim-led Bosnian government or the outside world will guarantee their safety.

While Bosniak leaders in Sarajevo discouraged Serbs from staying and there were instances of attacks and vandalism on those who tried to stay, Serb leaders presented this as the sole reason behind the exodus. The leadership of Republika Srpska used the displacement of Serbs from Sarajevo to their advantage by directing the refugees to Brčko, Zvornik, Bratunac and Srebrenica, thereby homogenizing the ethnic demography of the state. This conclusion was echoed by the Assembly of Bosnia who blamed the departure of Serbs on authorities in Pale, Bosnia and Herzegovina so that they could create an ethnically pure post-war Republika Srpska. By resettling Serbs in areas that were previously inhabited by Bosniaks, RS authorities ensured that Bosniaks would not return. Bosnian Serb-controlled media broadcast warnings to Sarajevo Serbs that it was dangerous for them to stay while Serb paramilitaries burned buildings in Sarajevo suburbs that were due to be transferred to the Federation, creating an atmosphere of panic and fear. Many were forced to leave under threats and intimidation from Bosnian Serb extremists and there were cases of killings of those who refused to follow orders.

In 1996, the Parliamentary Assembly of the Council of Europe cited the delay of the establishment of an international police force in Bosnia on the part of NATO as among the factors which contributed to Serbs leaving Sarajevo. It also noted the "systematic looting and torching" of Serbian suburbs of the city and the failure to prevent them as a reason for the exodus. The Implementation Force was criticized for not intervening and standing idly by as buildings were torched and burned.

== Media coverage ==
The Western observers claimed that Serbs used mass exhumations during their exodus from Sarajevo to gain moral victory. Peter Brock argued that even after the 1996 exodus, the Western media still refused to acknowledge the flight of tens of thousands of Sarajevo Serbs that occurred at the beginning of the Bosnian War in early 1992. Even before the exodus of Sarajevo Serbs began, another exodus of 17,000 Serbs from Odžak went unnoticed in the public.

Eventually, the exodus of Sarajevo Serbs forced foreign journalists including Tom Gjelten to reconsider their initial judgement about Sarajevo being harmonious.

== Sources ==
- Murtic, Dino (15 September 2015). Post-Yugoslav Cinema: Towards a Cosmopolitan Imagining. Springer. ISBN 978-1-137-52035-7.
- Turton, David (24 January 2003). War and Ethnicity: Global Connections and Local Violence. Boydell & Brewer Ltd. ISBN 978-0-85115-869-3.
- Brock, Peter (2005). Media Cleansing, Dirty Reporting: Journalism and Tragedy in Yugoslavia. GM Books. ISBN 978-1-882383-30-6.
- FBIS (1996). FBIS Daily Report: East Europe. Foreign Broadcast Information Service.
- Bollens, Scott A. (2007). Cities, Nationalism and Democratization. Routledge. ISBN 9781134111831.
- Burg, Steven L.; Shoup, Paul S. (2015). Ethnic Conflict and International Intervention: Crisis in Bosnia-Herzegovina, 1990-93. Routledge. ISBN 978-1-317-47102-8.
- Council of Europe (1998). Yearbook of the European Convention on Human Rights. Brill. ISBN 9789041105547.
- Chakravartty (1999). Mainstream. N. Chakravartty.
- War Report. Institute for War & Peace Reporting. 1996.
- McEvoy, Joanne; O'Leary, Brendan (22 April 2013). Power Sharing in Deeply Divided Places. University of Pennsylvania Press. ISBN 978-0-8122-0798-9.
