= Church of the Holy Archangels Michael and Gabriel, Sarajevo =

Orthodox Church in Sarajevo, Bosnia

Coordinates: 43.8602°N 18.4296°E

Church of the Holy Archangels Michael and Gabriel
- Црква светих Арханђела Михаила и Гаврила; Crkva svetih Arhanđela Mihaila i Gavrila
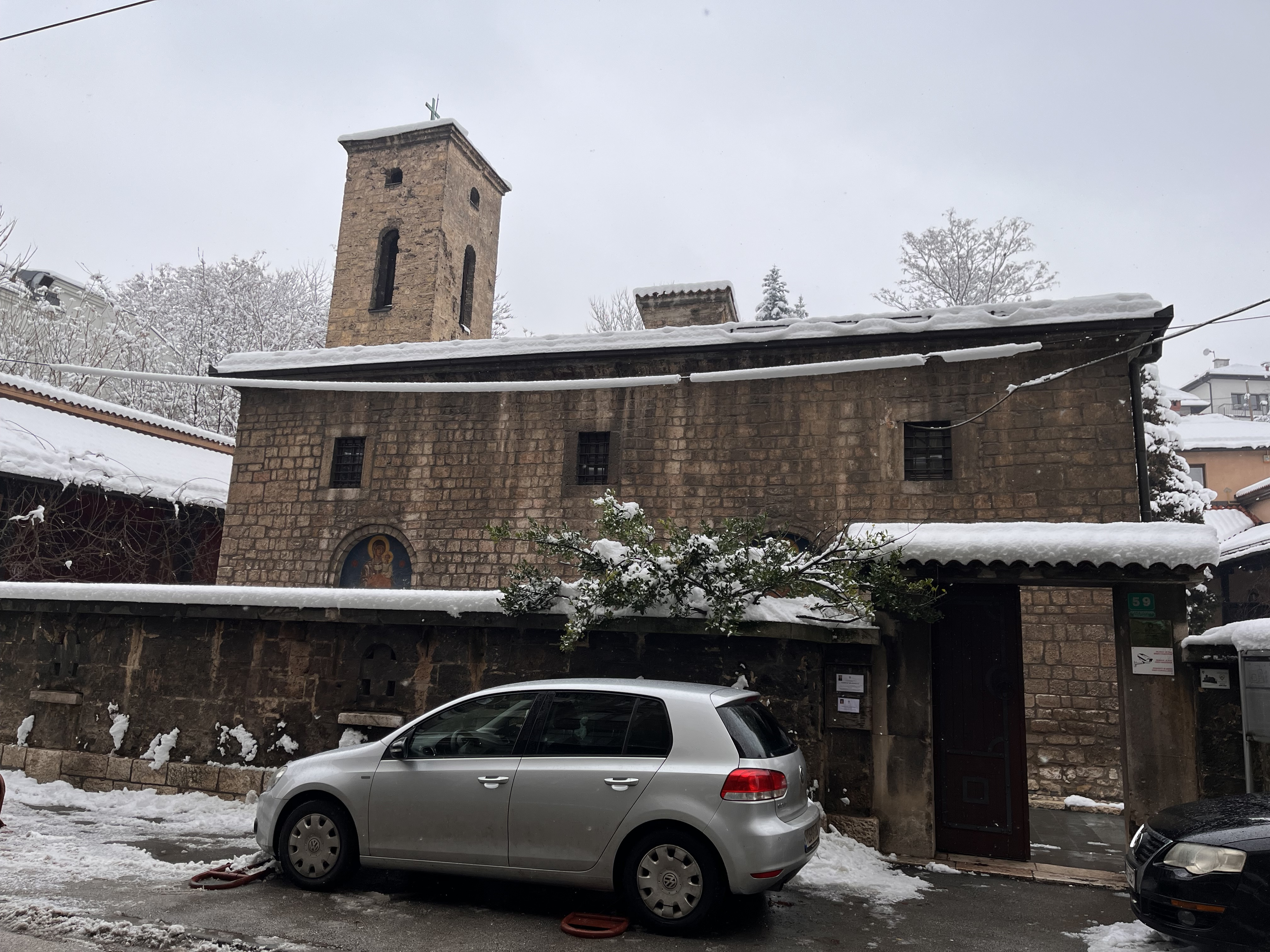
- The Old Orthodox Church in January 2023.

Religion
- Affiliation: Serbian Orthodox Church
- District: Metropolitanate of Dabar and Bosnia

Location
- Location: Sarajevo, Bosnia and Herzegovina
- Interactive map of Church of the Holy Archangels Michael and Gabriel

Architecture
- Completed: 1539 (first mention)

The Church of the Holy Archangels Michael and Gabriel (Serbian: црква св. Арханђела Михаила и Гаврила - crkva sv. Arhanđela Mihaila i Gavrila), also known as the Old Orthodox Church, is a Serbian Orthodox church in Sarajevo, Bosnia and Herzegovina. It was established in 1539. It was, however, built on older foundations.

The Old Church is listed National Monument of Bosnia and Herzegovina by KONS.

== See also ==
- Serbs in Sarajevo
- Serbs of Bosnia and Herzegovina
