= Organised crime in Bosnia and Herzegovina =

Bosnian mafia
- Founded: Early 1990s
- Founding location: Bosnia and Herzegovina
- Territory: Western Europe, Bosnia and Herzegowina, South America, North America
- Ethnicity: Bosniaks and Bosnian Serbs, Bosnian Croats
- Criminal activities: Drug trafficking, Cigarette smuggling, Assassination, Bank fraud, Blackmailing, Bribery, Contract killing, Infiltration of Politics, Money laundering, Murder, Police corruption, Political corruption, Witness intimidation, Witness tampering, Gambling, Human trafficking, extortion.

The Bosnian mafia, or Bosnian organised crime, is the body of illegal gangs and criminal organisations operating in Bosnia and Herzegovina and within the Bosnian diaspora. Bosnian organised crime figures operate mostly in Europe. Bosnian organised-crime groups are involved in a wide range of activities and extortion (often under the cover of ostensible security and insurance companies). Smuggling revenues are between €600 million and €900 million.

== Organised-crime groups and activities ==
The Bosnian mafia groups are involved in a wide range of activities; one of their more notorious activities occurred in 2003 when they smuggled and sold 250,000 Zastava M70 Yugoslav-made AK-47s to Iraq.

Corruption in Bosnia and Herzegovina is a severe problem, more than the federalist government of Bosnia and Herzegovina supposedly making fighting organised-crime groups difficult. Bosnia and Herzegovina consists of two largely independent entities, the Federation of Bosnia and Herzegovina and Republika Srpska – both of which have their own parliament, president and police force. Due to the poor cooperation between law-enforcement agencies in the two regions, criminals can often evade prosecution simply by moving from one to the other. Mafia groups from neighbouring countries (particularly Serbia and Croatia) often base their operations in Sarajevo, due to its proximity to Bosnia and Herzegovina.

There have been some efforts to increase collaboration between the two regions. In 2006 the European Union established the State Investigation and Protection Agency, a Bosnian federal police agency with authority in both regions, under the direct administration of the Ministry of Security of Bosnia and Herzegovina (BIH MIS).

Following the death of the historical leaders of the Sarajevo's underworld, a new generation of young criminals began to emerge. Among them the most notable are:

- Mirza Hatić: Born in 1987, he is in police records 20 times since 2002 for attempted murder, endangering security, extortion and illegal possession of weapons. Considered one of the most prominent figures in Sarajevo's underworld. Hatić was released from prison in 2021.
- Almer Inajetović: arrested 17 times for robbery, violent behavior, endangering security, extortion and illegal possession of weapons. However, he is best known for his racketeering caterers.
- Admir Lekić: accused of attempted murder, violent behavior, endangering security and illegal possession of weapons. Lekić was sentenced to 10 years in prison for attempted murder.
- Muamer Kulosman and Adi Karić: notorious racketeers in Sarajevo.
- Benjamin Delalić: Born in 1993, and son of the historical late boss Ramiz Delalić, he has been in police records since he was a minor. Most of the times, Delalić was allegedly involved in shooting between rival gangs.

In recent years, due to its drug trafficking activities, Bosnian criminal groups expanded their operations to South America. Numerous Bosnian nationals were arrested in South American countries related to cocaine trafficking to Europe, such as David Cufaj and Smail Šikalo.

=== Tito and Dino Cartel ===
The Tito and Bakir Cartel, led by Edin Gačanin, is said to be one of the major players in the drug trafficking in Europe, controlling one-third of the cocaine that enters the port of Rotterdam. It has also a strong presence in Peru, which according to a Peruvian official, the cartel is the main buyer of drugs in the country. The DEA considers the cartel's network to be one of the 50 largest drug trafficking operations on the planet. According to the investigations, the cartel is composed of family members and friends from Edin Gačanin's old neighborhood in Sarajevo. As of 2021 the cartel was based in Dubai.

Gačanin was arrested in Dubai in November 2022 being one of 49 people arrested in a concerted effort by Europol against the Tito and Dino cartel. however Gačanin was released on bail in January despite the Netherlands having filed extradition papers, his location is now unknown. In 2023 Edin Gačanin was sanctioned by the US who cited "close ties" to the Irish Kinahan Organised Crime Group and a €350m cocaine plot.

=== The United Tribuns ===
The United Tribuns is a motorcycle club involved in criminal activities which was founded in 2004 by Armin Ćulum in Villingen-Schwenningen in Baden-Württemberg. He came to Germany as a refugee during the Bosnian war. United Tribuns has been banned since 2022 for exploitative pimping, assault, drug trafficking and human trafficking. The group has called itself an association of bodybuilders, martial artists and doormen. They have local chapters in at least 4 countries: Germany, Austria, Bosnia and Spain. In Bosnia there is a subgroup called "Tribuns Guardians Balkan". In 2014, the Bavarian Verfassungsschutz reported that the number of members worldwide was around 1,700. In Germany, the Federal Ministry of the Interior banned the group on 14 September 2022.

== Key people ==
- Ramiz Delalić (15 February 1963 – 27 June 2007)
- Jusuf Prazina (7 September 1962 – 4 December 1993)
- Mušan Topalović (4 October 1957 – 26 October 1993)
- Ismet Bajramović (26 April 1966 - 17 December 2008)
- Zijad Turković (born 1966)
- Edin Gačanin (born 12 October 1982)
- Naser Kelmendi (born 1957)
- Darko Elez (born 1980)
- Đorđe Ždrale (born 1976)
- Admir Arnautović (born 1980)

== See also ==
- Human trafficking in Bosnia and Herzegovina
- Organized crime
