= Kazani pit killings =

Mass murder of predominantly ethnic Serbs in besieged Sarajevo

- Part of the Bosnian War
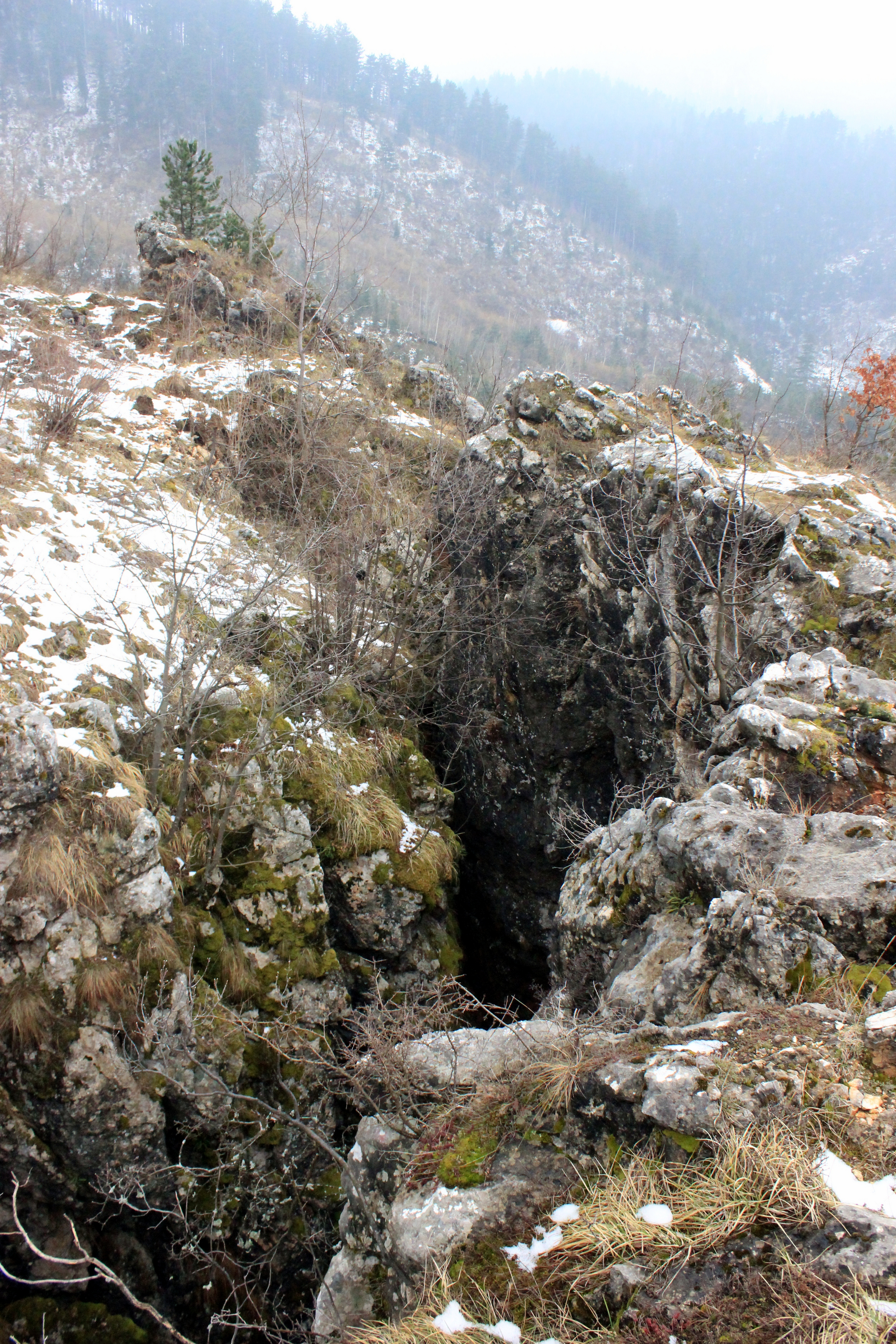
- The Kazani pit, located on the outskirts of Sarajevo. Used as an execution site and mass grave by Topalović and his forces.
- Location: Sarajevo, Bosnia and Herzegovina
- Date: April 1992 – October 1993
- Target: Predominantly Bosnian Serb civilians
- Attack type: Mass killing
- Deaths: 150–200
- Perpetrators: Mušan Topalović, 10th Mountain Brigade of the Army of Bosnia and Herzegovina

During the Siege of Sarajevo in the Bosnian War, a number of predominantly ethnic Serbs living inside besieged Sarajevo were murdered by the forces of Mušan Topalović, commander of the 10th Mountain Brigade in the Army of the Republic of Bosnia and Herzegovina, and disposed of in the Kazani pit mass grave.

== Crimes ==
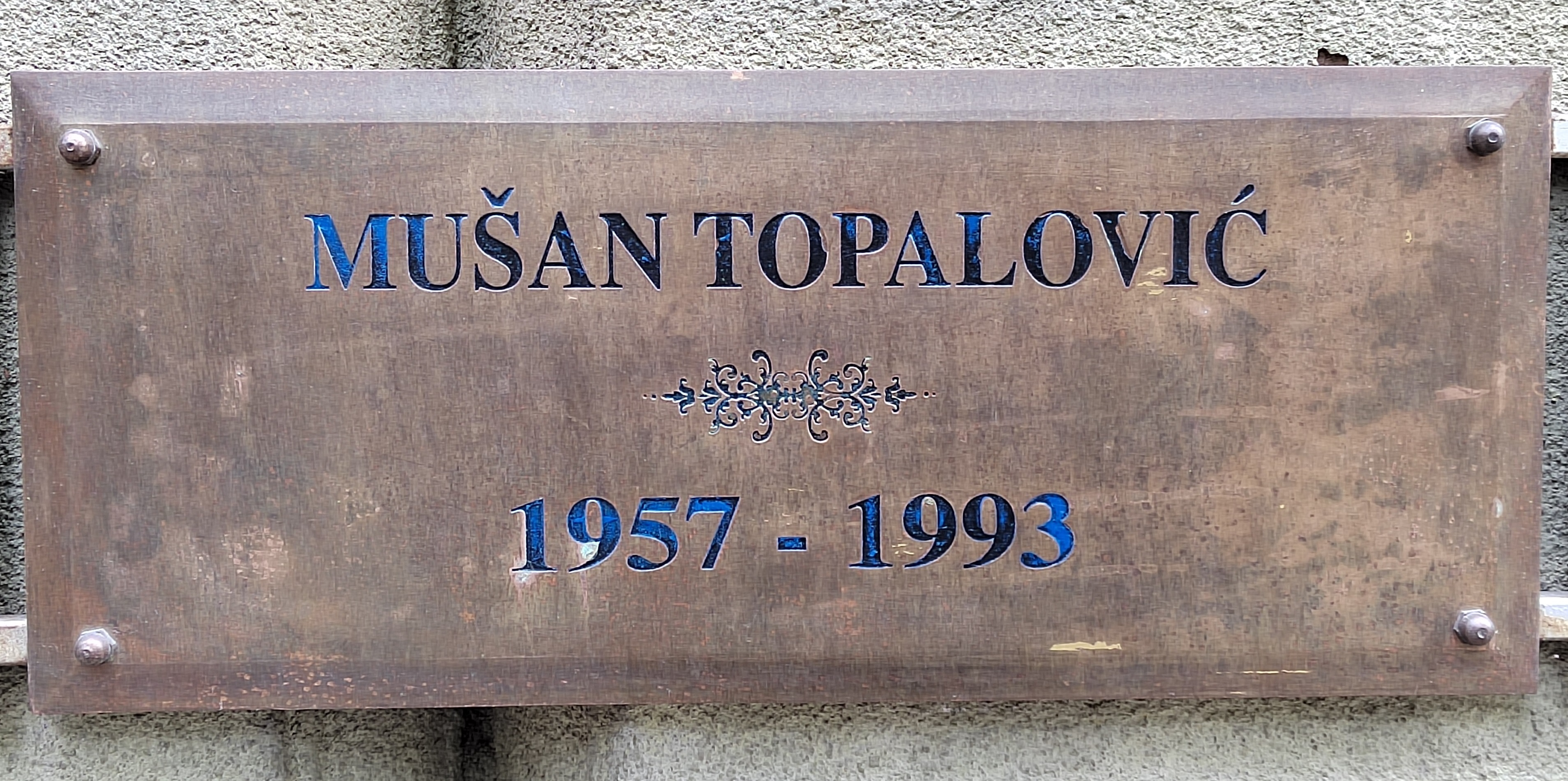
Memorial plaque to Mušan Topalović Caco in Sarajevo

Topalović, nicknamed "Caco", was a pre-war rock musician and gangster who became the commander of the Sarajevo-based unit at the outset of the war. He was also involved in the organization of the Patriotic League and Green Berets paramilitary units. Topalović, along with Jusuf Prazina, Ismet Bajramović and others, was one of the key criminals tasked with defending the city during the early stages of the war. Ramiz Delalić, who commanded the 9th Mountain Brigade in Sarajevo, and Topalović who commanded the 10th Brigade, controlled a large part of the besieged capital. Topalović controlled the area from Skenderija on the left bank of the Miljacka eastward. He exercised absolute power over neighborhoods, press-ganged recruits, ran black market smuggling, kidnapped and ransomed rich people, organized rapes, allocated empty houses, and likely executed more than 400 Serb fighters and civilians.

In one documented case, a family of six was gunned down by automatic weapons as they gathered to eat lunch, by assailants who were wearing uniforms of the Patriotic League. Jovan Divjak, an ethnic Serb general serving with the Army of the Republic of Bosnia and Herzegovina (ARBiH), said that local authorities had identified the killers within hours but police blocked the investigation – as in many other cases of anti-Serb violence.

The Kazani pit was located on Mount Trebević, below the positions of the Army of Republika Srpska (VRS), approximately 1.5 kilometres (0.93 mi) south of the city center. It was used by Caco and his men as a place for murder and as a mass grave for their victims. Serb civilians were rounded up, beaten and then killed, often by having their throats slit and being decapitated, before their bodies were pushed into the pit.

On May 27, 1993, Divjak informed Bosnian president Alija Izetbegović of the crimes carried out against Serb civilians in Sarajevo. He sent a five-page letter which not only detailed the killings being carried out by paramilitaries, but also listed the names of more than a dozen people who had been abducted and slain.

The magazine Dani was among the first publications to write about Topalović's crimes against Sarajevo's Serbs. In its January 29, 1993 issue, it published a three-page article about the suffering and position of Serbs in the city. In 22 reported incidents, 39 people were confirmed to have been killed, all but two of whom were ethnic Serbs whilst the nationalities of the other two victims were unknown.

== Arrests ==
On October 26, 1993, the Bosnian government launched a police action codenamed "Operation Trebević 2", with the aim of dealing with crime in their own ranks and returning renegade military groups to the system. The action was directed against the 9th motorized and 10th Mountain Brigade of the Army of Republic of Bosnia and Herzegovina, and its commanders. Bosnian police units disbanded Caco's paramilitary group, arrested 16 soldiers and killed Caco, who one Bosniak general described as "an inconvenient witness" to wartime atrocities. Caco's accomplices were indicted, but were given minimal sentences after a trial at the Sarajevo Military Court. Four people were sentenced to six years in prison each: Esad Tucaković, Zijo Kubat, Refik Čolak and Mevludin Selak, while eight were sentenced to ten months each for failure to report a crime and the perpetrators. A total of 14 soldiers were convicted of various atrocities, with most serving a few months.

Tucaković described the torture and murder of couple Vasilij and Ana Lavriv during his trial. After describing how he hit Vasilij Lavriv and killed him by slitting his throat, he continued:

I took my knife -- it was 40 centimeters long -- and severed her [Ana Lavriv's] head from her body. I pushed her corpse into the pit and left her head on the ground. After that I ran to the trench. I had blood all over my hands and clothes. I washed, so I did not see the killing of the other two people. When I got back to the brigade headquarters, I was told that Caco was pleased with my work.

The Bosnian government's relationship with Caco and his paramilitary group proved to be complicated as their defense of the city during its siege was a priority. Alibabić and others charge that Caco was eliminated not because he was an out-of-control commander but because he had become a political liability for Izetbegović and his inner circle of SDA political leaders who were accomplices in his dirty work. Caco was ceremoniously buried at the Kovača Martyr's Cemetery during a funeral organized by the Green Berets in December 1996, which attracted a large crowd of some 10,000 people. This caused dismay among the liberal-minded public in Sarajevo and prompted General Divjak to write a letter of protest to Izetbegović.

== Death toll ==
An exhumation of the mass graves at the Kazani pit was undertaken by investigators, with 29 bodies being recovered after a few days. However, the work was abruptly halted by the Interior Ministry and never resumed. "There were clearly more than 29 bodies in the pit," said Munir Alibabić, who at the time was the police chief of Sarajevo and was in charge of the investigation, "but I was ordered to stop all work. When I questioned the Minister of Interior, he told me this was a presidential order. I suspect that finding large numbers of bodies was politically inconvenient." Of the 15 victims that were identified, 10 were Serbs, 2 Ukrainians (Ana and Vasilj Lavrov), 2 Croats and one Bosniak.

The total number of victims killed at Kazani is not known, with estimates ranging from a few dozen to some hundreds. Victims estimates of Serb civilians killed in Bosnian government-held Sarajevo conducted by the Federation of Bosnia and Herzegovina officials say "at least 150". The actions of paramilitary units led many thousands of Serbs to flee the city, particularly in the summer of 1992. By war's end, the number of Serbs in Sarajevo was estimated to be in the low tens of thousands, fewer than 20% of those who had lived in the city in 1991.

== Commemoration ==
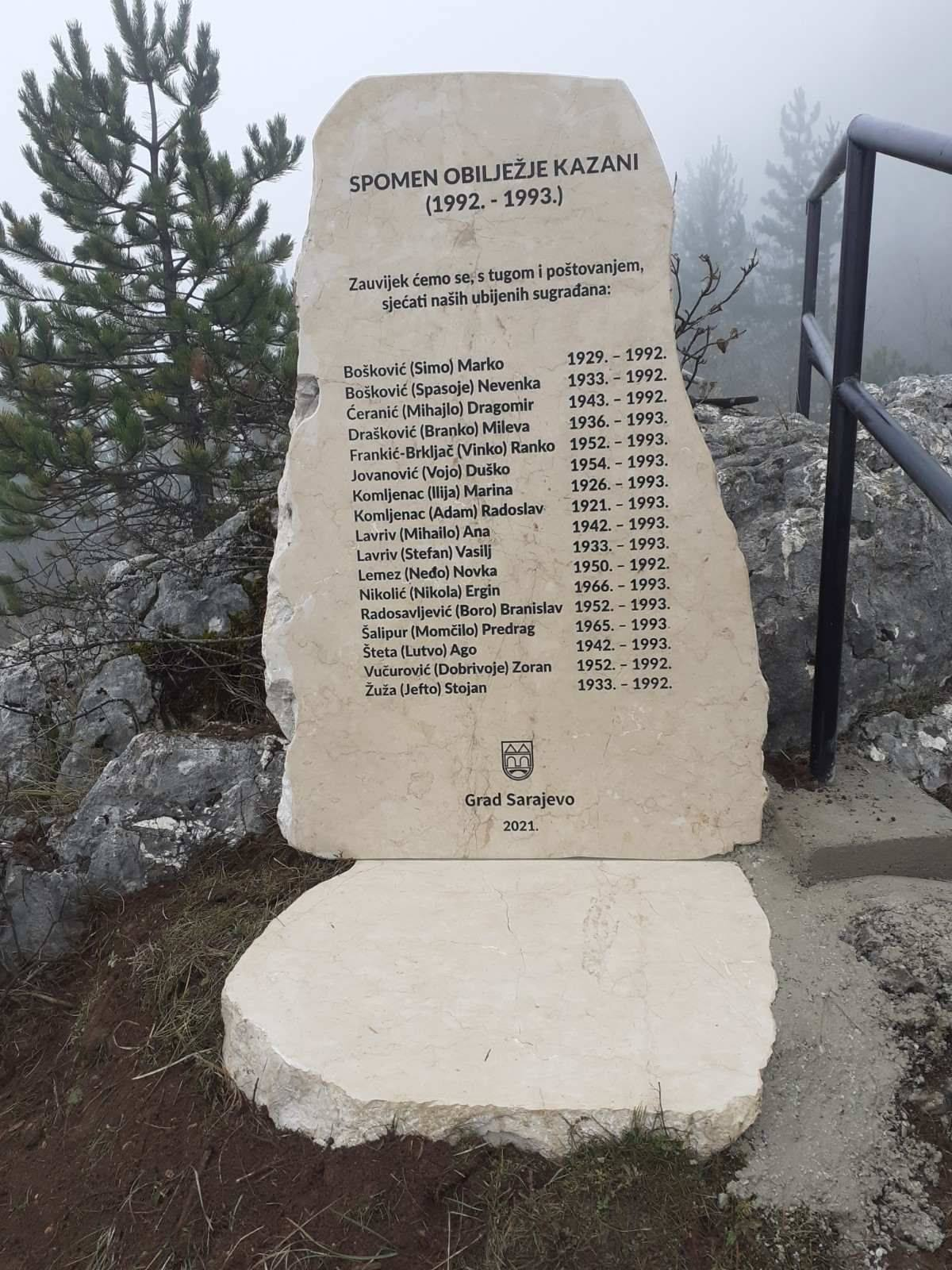
The monument in Kazani was officially unveiled on November 15, 2021.

The first public commemoration of remembrance for the crimes in Kazani were organized by the non-governmental agency UDIK in Sarajevo in 2014. In 2016, Bosniak politician Bakir Izetbegović, the son of Alija Izetbegović, paid tribute to Sarajevo Serb war victims by visiting the Kazani pit and laying flowers at the edge of the ravine.

=== Memorial ===
For years, several Bosnian NGOs including UDIK have called on the City of Sarajevo to build-up a monument to the victims killed in Kazani in the center of Sarajevo. In December 2020, the City Council of the City of Sarajevo included a memorial to the victims in Kazani in the plan of monuments to be financed and built in 2021. In May 2021 the city announced a competition for the design of a memorial to victims killed in Kazani.

On November 12, 2021, the Sarajevo City Administration put up a monument in Kazani. On November 15, Benjamina Karić, Milan Dunović and High Representative in Bosnia and Herzegovina Christian Schmidt unveiled the monument. UDIK, which was one of initiators of the memorial, and families of the victims did not attend the unveiling after it was revealed that the perpetrators' names would be omitted from the plaque. This was one of the main requests made by UDIK, the multi-ethnic Naša stranka Party and victims' families during the design process. Others, such as the Association of Winners of the Golden Lily and the Golden Police Badge, the Association of Veterans of the Patriotic League, the Association of Generals of Bosnia and Herzegovina, the SDA and the SDP Canton Committees, had supported the omission of the perpetrators.

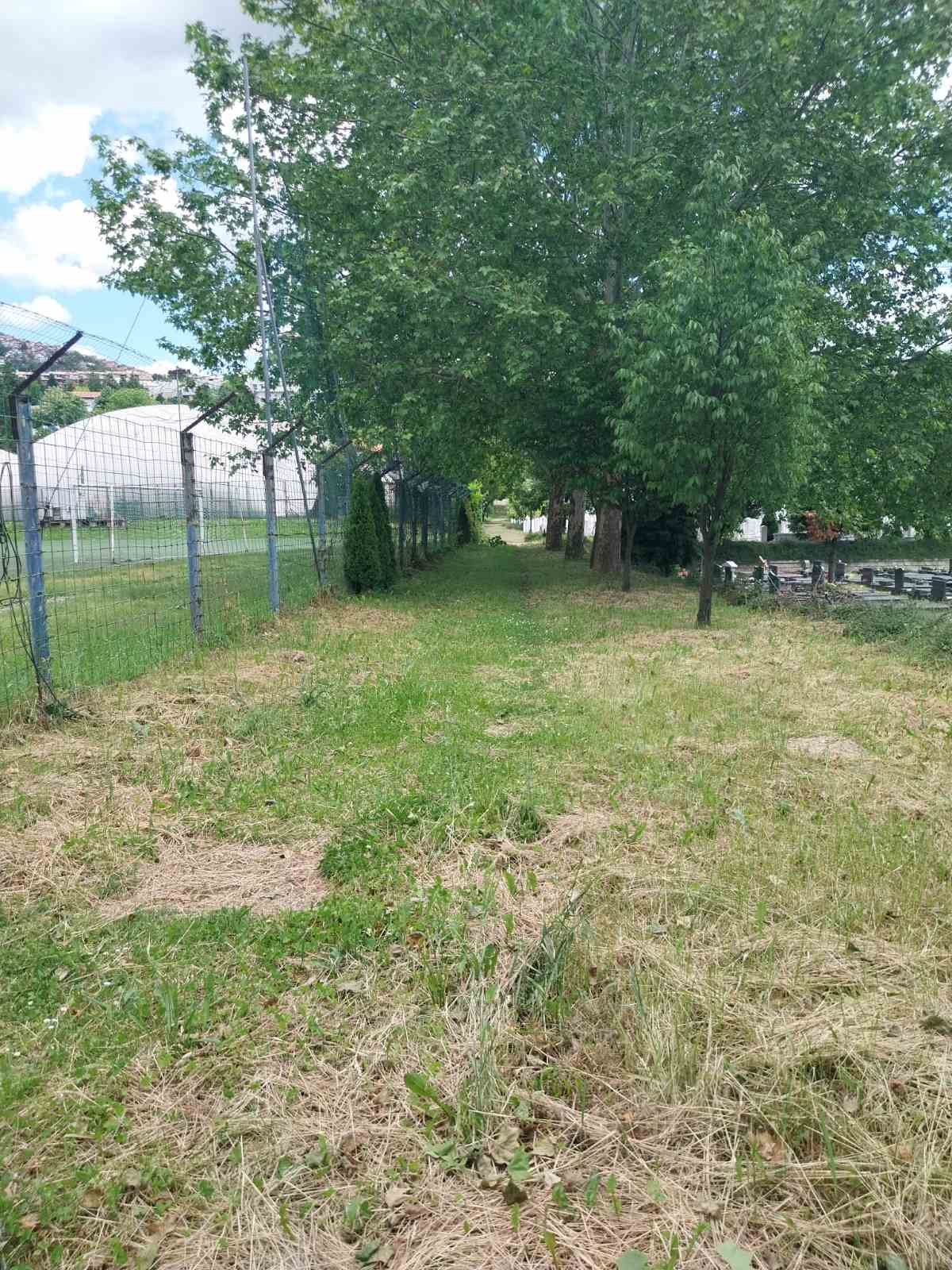
Place in St. Joseph Cemetery in Sarajevo where was mass grave of the Kazani victims 1993–1998.

In April 2022, UDIK started advocating for the installation of a memorial plaque at the St. Joseph Roman Catholic cemetery in Sarajevo, where some of the victims from mass graves were transported and exhumed between 1993 and 1998. The NGO claimed that the site of the former mass grave was unmarked and that it needed to be marked for new generations of youth people in future, but also for members of families of the victims. The initiative was sent to the local cemetery, and when no positive response was received, the request was sent to the Sarajevo City Council in 2023 and 2024 where it was rejected.

== About Kazani ==
- The Fixer: A Story from Sarajevo (2003) − Joe Sacco
- Ratni zločini na Kazanima: presude (2016, 2020) − UDIK
- Sarajevo’s most known public secret: Dealing with Caco, Kazani and crimes committed against Serbs in besieged Sarajevo, from the war until [2014, 2015] 2023 (2015, 2016, 2024) − Nicolas Moll
- Kazani: suđenja, (re)ekshumacije, memorijalizacija (2025) − UDIK

== Annotations ==
1. In earlier publications, the two victims are referred to as a Serbian couple and listed as Vasilij and Ana Lavriv. They were subsequently identified as Ukrainian nationals and their last name listed as Lavrov.
