= Living monument =

Yugoslav war commemorations

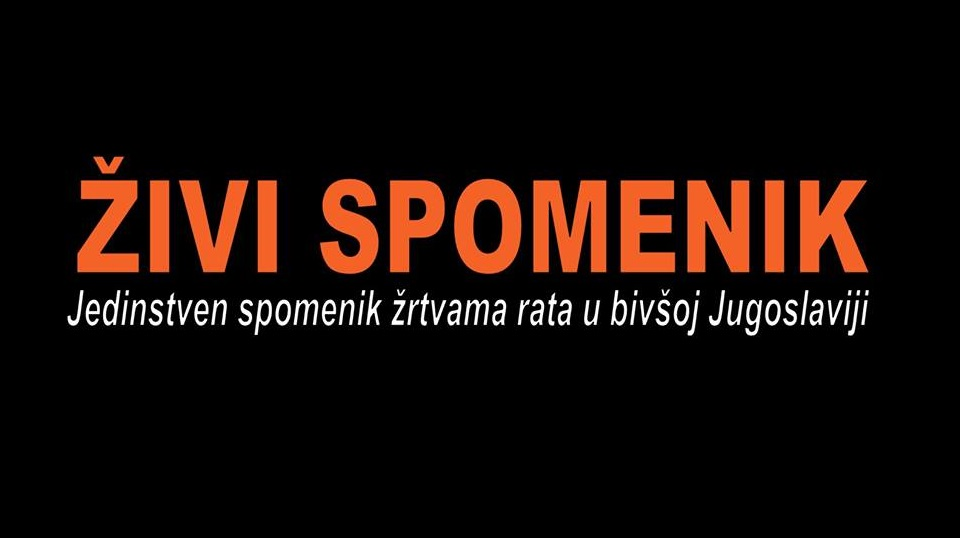

Living monument (Serbian Croatian: Živi spomenik/ Живи споменик) is a series of commemorations for the victims of the Yugoslav Wars organized by UDIK.

The commemorations are held in front of the Sacred Heart Cathedral in Sarajevo. Besides Sarajevo, UDIK has staged the monument in other locations, including Ahmići, Banja Luka, Belgrade, Bijeljina, Brčko, Višegrad, Zagreb, Priboj, Prijepolje, Srebrenica, Tuzla, Foča, and others.

== Activities ==
Anniversaries of crimes marked by UDIK in the period of 2013 – 2026:
Crimes committed in Vukovar	2013, 2014, 2015, 2016
Crimes committed in Foča camps	2014
Crimes committed in war camps in Rogatica	2014
Crimes committed in war camp Batković	2014
Siege of Sarajevo	2014
Crimes committed in war camp Luka (Brčko)	2014, 2015, 2016
Killing of Matea Jurić (Zenica)	2014, 2015, 2016
Crimes committed in the operation "Storm"	2014, 2015, 2016, 2017, 2018, 2019, 2022, 2023, 2024, 2025
Crimes committed at Kazani in Sarajevo	2014, 2015, 2016, 2020, 2021, 2022, 2023, 2024, 2025
Štrpci massacre (Priboj)	2014, 2015, 2016, 2017
Crimes committed in the village of Kravica (Bratunac)	2015, 2016, 2017
Sjeverin massacre (Priboj)	2015
20th anniversary of the Srebrenica genocide	2015
Crimes committed in Pionirska street (Višegrad)	2014, 2015
Crimes committed in Bikavac (Višegrad)	2015, 2016
Demolition of the Sava Bridge in Brčko	2015
Crimes committed at Kapija (Tuzla)	2015
Crimes committed in the village Trusina (Konjic)	2016
Ahmići massacre (Vitez)	2014, 2022, 2023, 2025, 2026
Genocide in Srebrenica	2014, 2015, 2016
Crimes committed in Bratunac	2015
Crimes committed in Zvornik	2016
Crimes committed in the village of Bukvik (Brčko)	2016
Markale massacres (Sarajevo)	2017, 2018, 2019
Murders in the Zanatski Center in Brčko	2023, 2024, 2025, 2026
