= Gornji Velešići massacre =

Mass killing during the Bosnian War

- Part of the Bosnian War and the Siege of Sarajevo
- Location: Sarajevo, Republic of Bosnia and Herzegovina
- Date: 8 July 1992
- Target: Bosnian Serb civilians
- Attack type: Mass shooting
- Deaths: 6
- Convictions: None

On 8 July 1992, during the Bosnian War and the siege of Sarajevo, six Bosnian Serb civilians were killed in the village of Gornji Velešići, on the city's outskirts. The victims were all members of the Ristović family and were shot dead while having lunch in their home. Petar Ristović, his sister Bosiljka, brother Obren, mother Radosava and cousins Mila and Danilo were killed in the attack. Radosava was 61 years old at the time of the shooting. Danilo was fourteen, and had reportedly only come to the house to bring his cousins fresh bread. The gunmen, wielding automatic weapons, were alleged to have worn uniforms of the Patriotic League, a Bosniak paramilitary unit, and reportedly drove away in a Bosnian police vehicle.

News of the killings spread through Sarajevo by word of mouth. Two days after the attack, local media outlets published a statement by the Ministry of Defence and the headquarters of the Army of the Republic of Bosnia and Herzegovina (ARBiH) saying the massacre had been committed by three individuals, who were not named. General Jovan Divjak, an ethnic Serb serving in the ARBiH, later stated that local officials had identified the assailants within hours of the attack. According to Divjak, the investigation into the massacre was blocked by the police, as in multiple other instances of wartime violence targeting Sarajevo's Serb population. The surviving members of the Ristović family, whose members had lived in Gornji Velešići for more than 300 years, left Sarajevo following the massacre and never returned. By the end of the war, almost no Serbs remained in the village. The perpetrators of the massacre have never been publicly identified or prosecuted.

== See also ==
- Kazani pit killings
- Sarajevo wedding attack
- Silos camp
