= Sarajevo wedding attack =

1992 attack on a Bosnian Serb wedding in Sarajevo

- Location: Sarajevo, SR Bosnia and Herzegovina, Socialist Federal Republic of Yugoslavia
- Date: 1 March 1992; 2:30 p.m. (Central European Time)
- Attack type: Shooting
- Deaths: 1 (Nikola Gardović)
- Injuries: 1 (Radenko Mirović)
- Accused: Ramiz Delalić

Around 2:30 p.m. on Sunday, 1 March 1992, a Bosnian Serb wedding procession in Sarajevo's old Muslim quarter of Baščaršija was attacked, resulting in the death of the father of the groom, Nikola Gardović, and the wounding of a Serbian Orthodox priest. The attack took place on the last day of a referendum on Bosnia and Herzegovina's independence from Yugoslavia, in the early stages of the breakup of Yugoslavia and the Yugoslav Wars.

In response to the shooting, Serb Democratic Party (SDS) irregulars set up barricades and roadblocks across Sarajevo, accusing the Bosnian Muslim Party of Democratic Action (SDA) of orchestrating the attack. The SDS demanded that Serb-inhabited areas of Bosnia and Herzegovina be patrolled by Serbs and not by police officers of other ethnicities and further called for United Nations peacekeepers to be deployed to the country. On 3 March, the SDS agreed to dismantle the barricades it had erected. The Muslim-dominated People's Assembly of Bosnia and Herzegovina declared the country's independence the same day.

Gardović is often regarded as the first casualty of the Bosnian War. Ramiz Delalić, a career criminal allegedly under the protection of the SDA, was quickly identified as a suspect but the Bosnian Muslim authorities made little effort to locate him in the immediate aftermath of the shooting. During the war, Delalić led a militia that persecuted Sarajevo's Serb population. He later admitted to carrying out the attack in a televised interview. In 2004, he was charged with one count of first-degree murder concerning Gardović's death. He was shot and killed in 2007, before his trial could be completed. In the Federation of Bosnia and Herzegovina, the country's semi-autonomous Bosniak–Croat entity, 1 March is celebrated as Independence Day. The holiday is not observed in the semi-autonomous Bosnian Serb entity Republika Srpska, and most Bosnian Serbs associate the date with the wedding attack rather than with the independence referendum. The shooting was dramatized in the 1997 British war film Welcome to Sarajevo.

== Background ==
Following the death of its longtime leader Josip Broz Tito in 1980, the multi-ethnic socialist state of Yugoslavia entered a period of protracted economic stagnation and decline. The anemic state of the country's economy resulted in a substantial increase in ethnic tensions, which were only exacerbated by the fall of communism in Eastern Europe in 1989. The following year, the League of Communists of Yugoslavia permitted democratic elections to be held nationwide. In Bosnia and Herzegovina, political parties were established largely along ethnic lines. The Bosnian Muslims founded the Party of Democratic Action (SDA) to represent their interests, the Bosnian Serbs founded the Serb Democratic Party (SDS) and the Bosnian Croats founded the Croatian Democratic Union of Bosnia and Herzegovina (HDZ BiH). The three parties were led by Alija Izetbegović, Radovan Karadžić, and Stjepan Kljuić, respectively. Bosnia and Herzegovina held its first democratic election on 18 November 1990. The voting was dominated by nationalist parties such as the SDA, SDS, and HDZ BiH. Socialist parties with no ethnic affiliation, most notably the League of Communists of Bosnia and Herzegovina, failed to win a significant percentage of the vote.

The SDA and HDZ BiH, representing the aspirations of most Bosnian Muslims and Bosnian Croats, advocated for Bosnia and Herzegovina's independence from Yugoslavia, a move opposed by the SDS and the vast majority of Bosnian Serbs. On 25 June, the governments of Slovenia and Croatia declared independence from Yugoslavia, leading to the Ten-Day War and the Croatian War of Independence, the first armed conflicts of what would become known as the Yugoslav Wars. In accordance with the RAM Plan, devised by the Yugoslav People's Army (JNA) as early as 1990, the State Security Administration began disseminating small arms to the Bosnian Serb population, resulting in the establishment of a number of Bosnian Serb militias across Bosnia and Herzegovina by the end of 1991. In November 1991, the SDS organized a plebiscite, boycotted by Bosnian Muslims and Bosnian Croats, in which the vast majority of Bosnian Serbs voted to remain part of Yugoslavia. (Note: The Bosnian government declared the referendum unconstitutional.) The following month, an arbitration commission established by the European Economic Community (EEC) declared that a legally binding nationwide independence referendum would be a prerequisite for the EEC's eventual recognition of Bosnia and Herzegovina's independence. A nationwide independence referendum was thus scheduled to be held between 29 February and 1 March. The SDS rejected such a referendum as unconstitutional. Consequently, at the party's urging, the vast majority of Bosnian Serbs boycotted it. On 9 January 1992, the SDS announced the establishment of the Serbian Republic of Bosnia and Herzegovina, a self-proclaimed autonomous entity which was to include all the municipalities in which more than 50 percent of voters had voted to remain part of Yugoslavia.

Like much of Bosnia and Herzegovina, the capital Sarajevo was ethnically and religiously diverse. According to the 1991 Yugoslav population census, the city had 525,980 inhabitants, 49.3 percent of whom identified as Bosnian Muslims, 29.9 percent of whom identified as Serbs, 10.7 percent of whom identified as Yugoslavs and 6.6 percent of whom identified as Croats.

== Attack ==
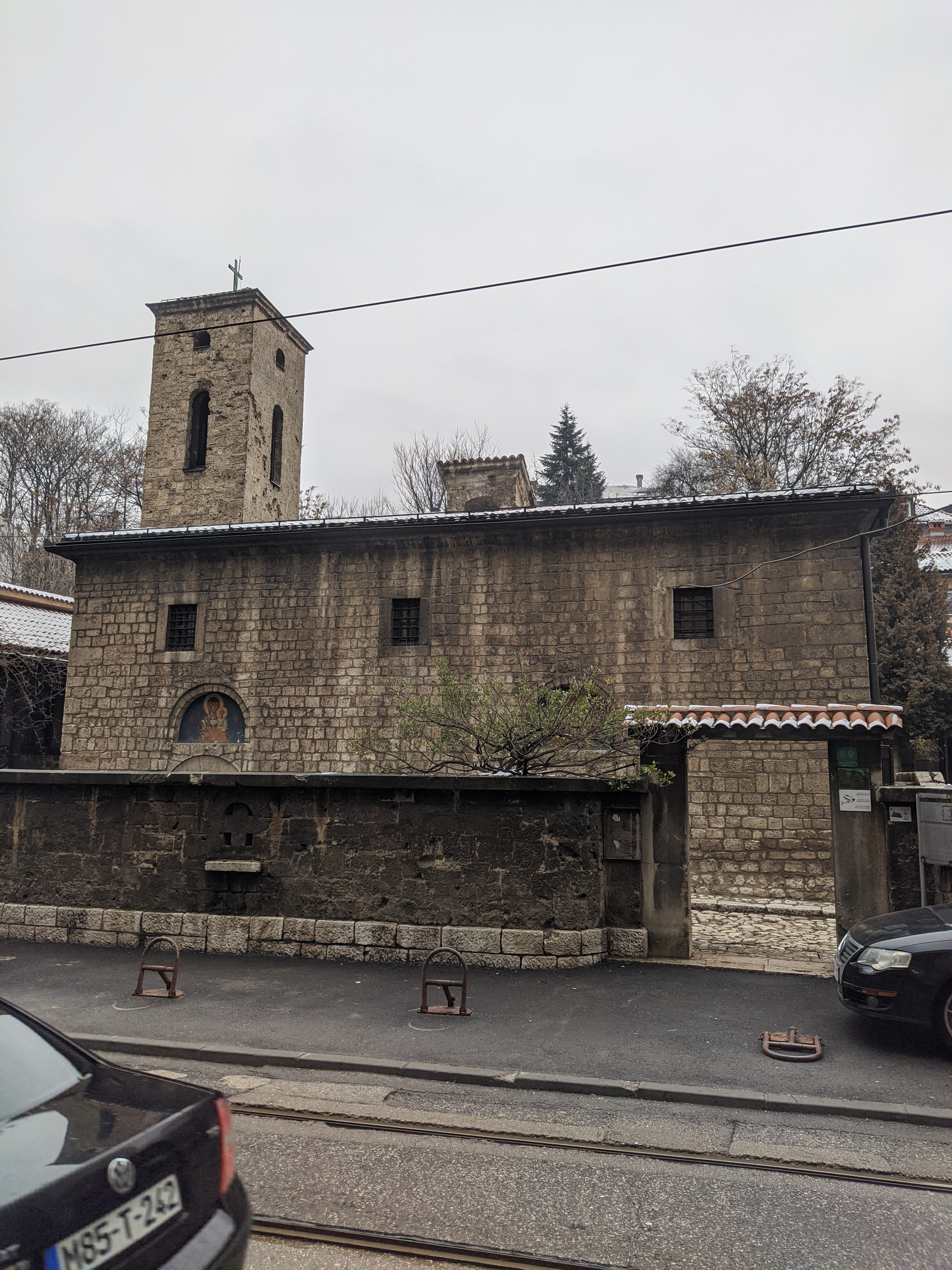
The Old Orthodox Church in Sarajevo

On Sunday, 1 March 1992, the final day of voting, the wedding of a Bosnian Serb couple, Milan Gardović and Dijana Tambur, was held at the Church of the Holy Transfiguration in Novo Sarajevo. The groom was a seminarian in his final year of study. His father, Nikola, was a sacristan at the Church of the Holy Transfiguration. The historian Kenneth Morrison describes the atmosphere in Sarajevo that day as "tense". Following the ceremony, the newlyweds, their respective families and the wedding guests drove to the Church of the Holy Archangels Michael and Gabriel, colloquially known as the Old Orthodox Church, in the city's old Muslim quarter of Baščaršija, where a wedding meal was supposed to be held. The Church of the Holy Archangels Michael and Gabriel was Sarajevo's oldest Serbian Orthodox religious building.

The flag of the Serbian Orthodox Church was brandished by wedding guests

Because there was no parking space near the Church of the Holy Archangels Michael and Gabriel, the wedding party decided to head towards the church on foot, forming a procession that stretched from the nearest parking lot to the church itself. During the procession, members of the wedding party brandished Serbian flags, which many Bosnian Muslim passersby interpreted as a deliberate provocation. Such processions were typical of Serb weddings across Yugoslavia. They were usually accompanied by the honking of car horns and the singing of songs. Around 2:30 p.m., four young men emerged from a white Volkswagen Golf and attempted to seize a flag from one of the wedding guests. A scuffle ensued, and according to eyewitnesses, one of the men opened fire at the procession.

Viktor Meier, a correspondent writing for the German daily Frankfurter Allgemeine Zeitung, was a chance eyewitness to the attack, and wrote of it in his 1995 book Yugoslavia: A History of its Demise. "At first, it seemed to be a detonator," Meier wrote of the gunshots, "but then I saw people in a frenzy; I heard cries and saw someone run to the nearest telephone and saw the terrified faces of passers-by." Gardović's father was killed in the attack, and a Serbian Orthodox priest, Radenko Mirović, was wounded.

== Aftermath ==
=== Response ===
"The emotional charge of the incident was strong on both sides," the historian Mladen Ančić writes, "because a Serb wedding procession, displaying Serb symbols, on its way to the oldest Serb church in Sarajevo was stopped by a Muslim bullet." For most Serbs, the attack represented "a point of no return", the historian John R. Schindler writes. The shooting was immediately denounced by SDS officials. Karadžić said the attack proved that the independence movement posed an existential threat to the Bosnian Serbs. "This shot was a great injustice aimed at the Serb people," the President of the People's Assembly of Bosnia and Herzegovina, Momčilo Krajišnik, remarked. SDS spokesman Rajko Dukić stated that the wedding attack was evidence that Sarajevo's Serbs were "in mortal danger" and argued that an independent Bosnia and Herzegovina would threaten the Bosnian Serbs' security even further. Izetbegović condemned the murder, calling it "a shot at all Bosnia". The mayor of Sarajevo's Stari Grad municipality, Selim Hadžibajrić, expressed his condolences to Gardović's family. The Bosnian Muslim paramilitary leader Sefer Halilović, who had founded the militia known as the Patriotic League in March 1991, struck a different tone. Halilović claimed that the procession "wasn't really a wedding, but a provocation" and that the members of the wedding party were SDS activists. "They wanted to go through Baščaršija with the cars, with the flags, with the banners, to provoke us and see how we would react," Halilović remarked.

The attack prompted a "competition for urban space that would develop into the outright besieging and division of the city," the historian Catherine Baker writes. Roadblocks and barricades quickly appeared across Sarajevo, first Bosnian Serb ones and then Bosnian Muslim ones. The SDS demanded that Serb-inhabited areas of Bosnia and Herzegovina be patrolled by Serbs, and not by police officers of other ethnicities, and further called for United Nations peacekeepers to be deployed to the country. Two days after the attack, the SDS agreed to remove the barricades it had erected. This breakthrough was achieved by the JNA general Milutin Kukanjac, who successfully convinced the leaders of the SDA and SDS to allow joint patrols by the JNA and the Bosnian Police. The same day, Izetbegović declared the independence of the Republic of Bosnia and Herzegovina, and the Muslim-dominated People's Assembly quickly ratified the decision. (Note: The independence referendum was reported as having a voter turnout of 63.4 percent, of whom 99.8 percent voted for independence. Since only 63.4 percent of eligible voters had taken part, the referendum failed to attain the two-thirds majority mandated by Bosnia and Herzegovina's constitution.) Gardović was buried in Sarajevo on 4 March. His funeral was officiated by the bishop Vasilije Kačavenda. "I will not say, as some unintelligent politicians have, that the shot that killed this man was a shot at Bosnia," Kačavenda remarked during his eulogy. "But it was a warning to our three nations. Let Nikola's sacrifice be the last of these crazy times."

Coverage of the attack largely eclipsed that of the concurrent referendum. Serbian newspapers largely portrayed the attack as one for which all Bosnian Muslims bore collective responsibility. The following passage from the Belgrade daily Politika was typical: "The killers of the Serb wedding guest are not the three attackers, but those who created the atmosphere which abolished Bosnia-Herzegovina once and for all." The Sarajevo daily Oslobođenje veered in the opposite direction, attempting to obfuscate the attackers' ethnic identities. A column published a day after the attack read: "The killers of the wedding guest at Baščaršija, hate-mongers and barricade-builders, were not only not Sarajevans, they were not even true Bosnians, but strangers." (Note: Under Tito, the media either reported on instances of inter-ethnic violence using euphemisms or avoided reporting on them altogether, so as not to inflame inter-ethnic tensions. "In its coverage of the wedding march killing and its aftermath," the journalist Tom Gjelten remarked, "Oslobođenje looked again like the Party organ of old.") The column went on to insinuate that the wedding procession had been a deliberate provocation. Many Serb readers considered Oslobođenje's reaction to the attack insensitive and sent angry letters to the editor in response. Miroslav Janković, a Serb member of the newspaper's editorial board, vented his fury at the following day's board meeting, describing the column as "the most shameless thing this newspaper has published in fifty years."

=== Responsibility ===
Eyewitnesses identified the individual who fired at the wedding procession as Ramiz Delalić, a career criminal. The SDS leadership immediately blamed the SDA for the attack and alleged that Delalić was under the SDA's protection. Before the attack, Delalić had been implicated in another shooting, as well as a rape, and had received treatment at a psychiatric hospital. On 3 March 1992, the local authorities had issued a warrant for Delalić's arrest but made little effort to find him. SDS officials alleged that the authorities' failure to arrest Delalić was evidence of the SDA's complicity in the attack.

During the siege of Sarajevo, Delalić led a Bosnian Muslim paramilitary unit that attacked and murdered Bosnian Serb and Bosnian Muslim civilians. The impunity entrusted Delalić by the Bosnian Muslim authorities was such that he openly admitted to opening fire on the wedding guests in a televised interview. The authorities only cracked down on Delalić's militia in late 1993 after it began targeting non-Serbs. On 1 March 1997, the fifth anniversary of the wedding attack, Delalić publicly threatened a father and son inside a Sarajevo restaurant and brandished a pistol in front of patrons, an offence for which he was later convicted. In June 1999, he ran over and injured a police officer with his car and was again imprisoned. This latter incident prompted Carlos Westendorp, the High Representative for Bosnia and Herzegovina, to urge the country's authorities to investigate Delalić's wartime activities. On 8 December 2004, Delalić was charged with one count of first degree murder concerning the wedding attack. His trial commenced on 14 February 2005. On the first day of court proceedings, prosecutors played the jury a videotape of the wedding attack, which appeared to show Delalić firing at the procession. The same day, Delalić posted bail and was released on his own recognizance. On 27 June 2007, before his trial could be completed, Delalić was shot and killed by unidentified gunmen in Sarajevo.

On 19 September 2012, prosecutors in Sarajevo charged the Kosovo Albanian drug lord Naser Kelmendi with ordering Delalić's murder. Kelmendi had fled Bosnia and Herzegovina in 2012 after being sanctioned under the United States' Foreign Narcotics Kingpin Designation Act. He was also indicted on several counts of drug trafficking. He was arrested by the Kosovo Police in Pristina on 6 May 2013. Since Bosnia and Herzegovina does not recognize Kosovo and thus has no extradition agreement with it, Kelmendi was tried in Pristina for crimes that he was alleged to have committed in Bosnia and Herzegovina. In October 2016, the senior Bosniak (Note: The name Bosniak was adopted by a congress of leading Bosnian Muslim intellectuals in September 1993. Before this, Bosniaks were referred to as Bosnian Muslims.) politician Fahrudin Radončić, who had been acquainted with Delalić, testified in Kelmendi's defense. In 2012, Radončić had been named in Kelmendi's indictment as one of the plotters in the conspiracy to kill Delalić but was never personally charged and denied the allegations. Radončić testified that Delalić had told him that the wedding attack had been ordered by Izetbegović and the SDA. Radončić further testified that Delalić's assassination had been ordered by "the Bosniak state mafia", and not by Kelmendi, because Delalić had wished to discuss the Izetbegović family's alleged involvement in organized crime with prosecutors. (Note: At the time of Radončić's testimony, his party, the Alliance for a Better Future, was the SDA's coalition partner at the national and sub-national level. Radončić's testimony increased tensions between the two parties, but the SDA decided to remain within the coalition so as not to trigger a new election.) On 1 February 2018, Kelmendi was convicted on one count of drug trafficking and sentenced to six years' imprisonment; he was acquitted on all counts relating to Delalić's murder.

== Legacy ==
Nikola Gardović is often considered the first casualty of the Bosnian War. Among Bosnian Serbs, the attack is commonly referred to as the Bloody Wedding. The Indian academic Radha Kumar has compared the wedding attack to violent incidents that have preceded inter-communal violence in India. On 6 April, the EEC and the United States recognized Bosnia and Herzegovina as an independent state. The same day, the Bosnian Serb leadership declared the independence of the Serbian Republic of Bosnia and Herzegovina, later renamed Republika Srpska. Bosnia and Herzegovina was admitted into the UN on 22 May. The ensuing Bosnian War left 100,000 dead; an additional two million were displaced. The war ended with the signing of the Dayton Agreement in December 1995, in which the warring parties agreed to divide the country into two semi-autonomous entities, the Federation of Bosnia and Herzegovina and Republika Srpska. Following the war, most of Republika Srpska's wartime leadership was indicted by the International Criminal Tribunal for the former Yugoslavia. Among them was Karadžić, who was convicted of war crimes and crimes against humanity, as well as genocide for his role in the Srebrenica massacre of 1995, and sentenced to life imprisonment in March 2019.

Fleeing the war, Milan and Dijana Gardović immigrated to Sweden, where Milan now serves as a Serbian Orthodox priest. In the Federation of Bosnia and Herzegovina, 1 March is celebrated as Independence Day, a non-working holiday. Independence Day is not observed in Republika Srpska and most Bosnian Serbs associate the date with the wedding attack rather than with the independence referendum. The attack was dramatized in the 1997 British war film Welcome to Sarajevo, with Bosnian Serb paramilitaries as the perpetrators and Bosnian Croat civilians as the victims. "These changes were introduced obviously for political reasons," the film scholar Goran Gocić opines. The anthropologist Stephen Harper concurs. He writes, "the switching of ethnic identities in the staging of the wedding party massacre in Welcome to Sarajevo ... offers a further example of how cinematic images can be used for the ideological rewriting of history."
