= 1992 Bosnian independence referendum =

- 29 February–1 March 1992
- Are you for a sovereign and independent Bosnia and Herzegovina, a state of equal citizens, the people of Bosnia and Herzegovina — Muslims, Serbs, Croats and members of other peoples living in it?
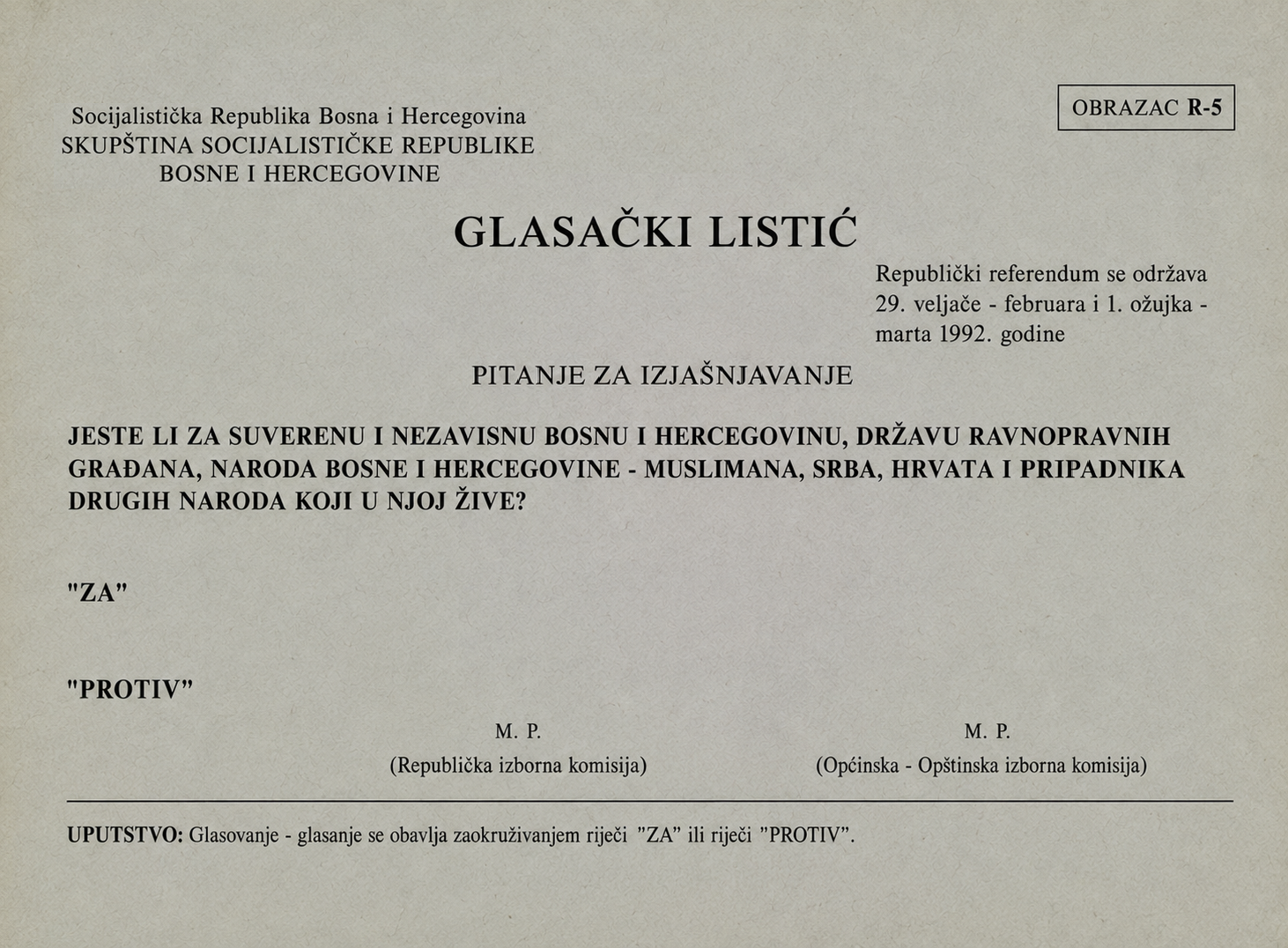

Results
| Choice | Votes | % |
|---|---|---|
| Yes | 2,061,932 | 99.71% |
| No | 6,037 | 0.29% |
| Valid votes | 2,067,969 | 99.75% |
| Invalid or blank votes | 5,227 | 0.25% |
| Total votes | 2,073,196 | 100.00% |
| Registered voters/turnout | 3,253,847 | 63.72% |

An independence referendum was held in the Socialist Republic of Bosnia and Herzegovina between 29 February and 1 March 1992, following the first free elections of 1990 and the rise of ethnic tensions that eventually led to the breakup of Yugoslavia. Independence was strongly favoured by Muslim and Croat voters while Serbs boycotted the referendum or were prevented from participating by Bosnian Serb authorities.

The total turnout of voters was 64%, 99.7% of whom voted for independence. On 3 March, the president of the Presidency of Bosnia and Herzegovina Alija Izetbegović declared the independence of the Republic of Bosnia and Herzegovina and the parliament ratified the action. On 6 April, the United States and the European Economic Community recognized Bosnia and Herzegovina as an independent state and on 22 May it was admitted into the United Nations.

== Background ==
In November 1990, the first free elections were held, putting nationalist parties into power with three parties. These were the Party of Democratic Action (SDA), led by Alija Izetbegović, the Serbian Democratic Party (SDS), led by Radovan Karadžić, and the Croatian Democratic Union of Bosnia and Herzegovina (HDZ BiH), led by Stjepan Kljuić. Izetbegović was elected as the President of the Presidency of the Socialist Republic of Bosnia and Herzegovina. Jure Pelivan, of the HDZ, was elected as the Prime Minister of the Government of the Socialist Republic of Bosnia and Herzegovina. Momčilo Krajišnik, of the SDS, was elected as the speaker of the Assembly of the Socialist Republic of Bosnia and Herzegovina.

Throughout 1990, the RAM Plan was developed by a group of Serb officers of the Yugoslav People's Army (JNA) and experts from the JNA's Psychological Operations Department to organize Serbs outside Serbia, consolidate control of the SDS, and prepare arms and ammunition. In 1990 and 1991, Serbs in Croatia and in Bosnia and Herzegovina had proclaimed several Serbian Autonomous Oblasts (SAOs) to unify them later to create a Greater Serbia. As early as September or October 1990, the JNA had begun to arm Bosnian Serbs and organize them into militias. That same year the JNA disarmed the Territorial Defense Force of the Republic of Bosnia and Herzegovina (TORBiH). By March 1991, the JNA had distributed an estimated 51,900 firearms to Serb paramilitaries and 23,298 firearms to the SDS. Throughout 1991 and early 1992, the SDS heavily Serbianized the police force to increase Serb political control. According to Noel Malcolm, the "steps taken by Karadžić and his party – [declaring Serb] Autonomous Regions, the arming of the Serb population, minor local incidents, non-stop propaganda, the request for federal army "protection" – matched exactly what had been done in Croatia. Few observers could doubt that a single plan was in operation."

In a session on 15 October 1991, the Bosnian Parliament, alarmed by the existence of the RAM Plan, approved the "Memorandum on Sovereignty" through the use of a parliamentary movement to reopen parliament after Krajišnik had closed it and after Serb deputies had walked out. On 24 October 1991, the SDS formed the Assembly of the Serb People of Bosnia and Herzegovina and in November held a referendum about remaining within Yugoslavia. At the same time it issued the "Instructions for the Organization and Activities of the Organs of the Serbian People in Bosnia and Herzegovina in Emergency Conditions" which told SDS officials to form Serb Municipal Assemblies and Crisis Staffs, secure supplies for Serbs, and create extensive communication networks. In January 1992, the assembly declared the creation of the Republic of the Serb People of Bosnia and Herzegovina and its secession. The Bosnian government declared the referendum an unconstitutional and self-proclaimed entity and it was recognized only by Yugoslavia.

== Recognition ==
Flag adopted by the Republic of Bosnia and Herzegovina.

In late December 1991, Muslim and Croat politicians asked the European Economic Community (EEC) to recognize Bosnia and Herzegovina with Slovenia, Croatia and Macedonia as sovereign nations. The Badinter Arbitration Committee, set up by the EEC, initially refused to recognize Bosnia and Herzegovina because of its "absence of a referendum" while it determined (among other things) that Yugoslavia was in the process of dissolution and the internal boundaries of its republics could not be altered without agreement. In January 1992, the EEC ruled that "the will of the peoples of Bosnia Herzegovina to constitute the Social Republic of Bosnia Herzegovina as a sovereign and independent cannot be held to have been fully established" and suggested "a referendum of all the citizens of the SRBH without distinction"; this could not be normally held, because Serb authorities prevented their people from participating. That month, Slobodan Milošević issued a secret order to transfer all JNA officers born in Bosnia and Herzegovina to the Socialist Republic of Serbia and enlist them in a new Bosnian Serb army. On 23 January, EEC Council of Ministers president João de Deus Pinheiro said that the EEC would recognize Bosnia and Herzegovina if an independence referendum was approved.

On 25 January a debate over a referendum was held in Parliament, ending when the Serb deputies withdrew after Muslim and Croat delegates rejected a Serb motion that it be determined by a yet-to-be-formed Council for National Equality. After Momčilo Krajišnik tried to adjourn the session, he was replaced by an SDA member and the proposal to hold a referendum was adopted in the absence of the SDS. Since the referendum intended to change the status of Bosnia and Herzegovina from a federal state of Yugoslavia to a sovereign state, it breached the Constitution of Yugoslavia (since the Assembly of the Socialist Republic of Bosnia and Herzegovina did not have jurisdiction, and exceeded its powers). According to the Yugoslav constitution, changing the borders of Yugoslavia was impossible without the consent of all republics. The referendum was also unconstitutional in terms of the Constitution of the Socialist Republic of Bosnia and Herzegovina. Amendment LXX to the constitution established a council entrusted with exercising the right to equality of the nations and nationalities of Bosnia and Herzegovina. The proposal for a referendum on the "status of Bosnia and Herzegovina" was required to be considered by the Council, since such a referendum directly impacted "the principles of equality among nations and nationalities".

== Results ==
Of those voting, 99.7% voted in favour of independence. Independence was strongly favoured by Muslim and Bosnian Croat voters, while Bosnian Serbs largely boycotted the referendum or were prevented from participating by Bosnian Serb authorities. According to the SDS, independence would result in the Serbs becoming "a national minority in an Islamic state". It blocked the delivery of ballot boxes with armed irregular units and dropped leaflets encouraging a boycott, although thousands of Serbs in larger cities voted for independence. There were bombings and shootings throughout the voting period, most notably the Sarajevo wedding attack.

Voter turnout was 64 per cent, of whom 99.7 per cent voted for independence. However, the referendum failed to attain the constitutionally required two-thirds majority since only 64 per cent of eligible voters participated. On 3 March, Alija Izetbegović declared the independence of the Republic of Bosnia and Herzegovina and the Bosnian parliament ratified his action.

| Choice | Votes | % |
|---|---|---|
| For | 2,061,932 | 99.71 |
| Against | 6,037 | 0.29 |
| Total | 2,067,969 | 100.00 |
| Valid votes | 2,067,969 | 99.75 |
| Invalid/blank votes | 5,227 | 0.25 |
| Total votes | 2,073,196 | 100.00 |
| Registered voters/turnout | 3,253,847 | 63.72 |
Source: Nohlen & Stöver

== Aftermath ==
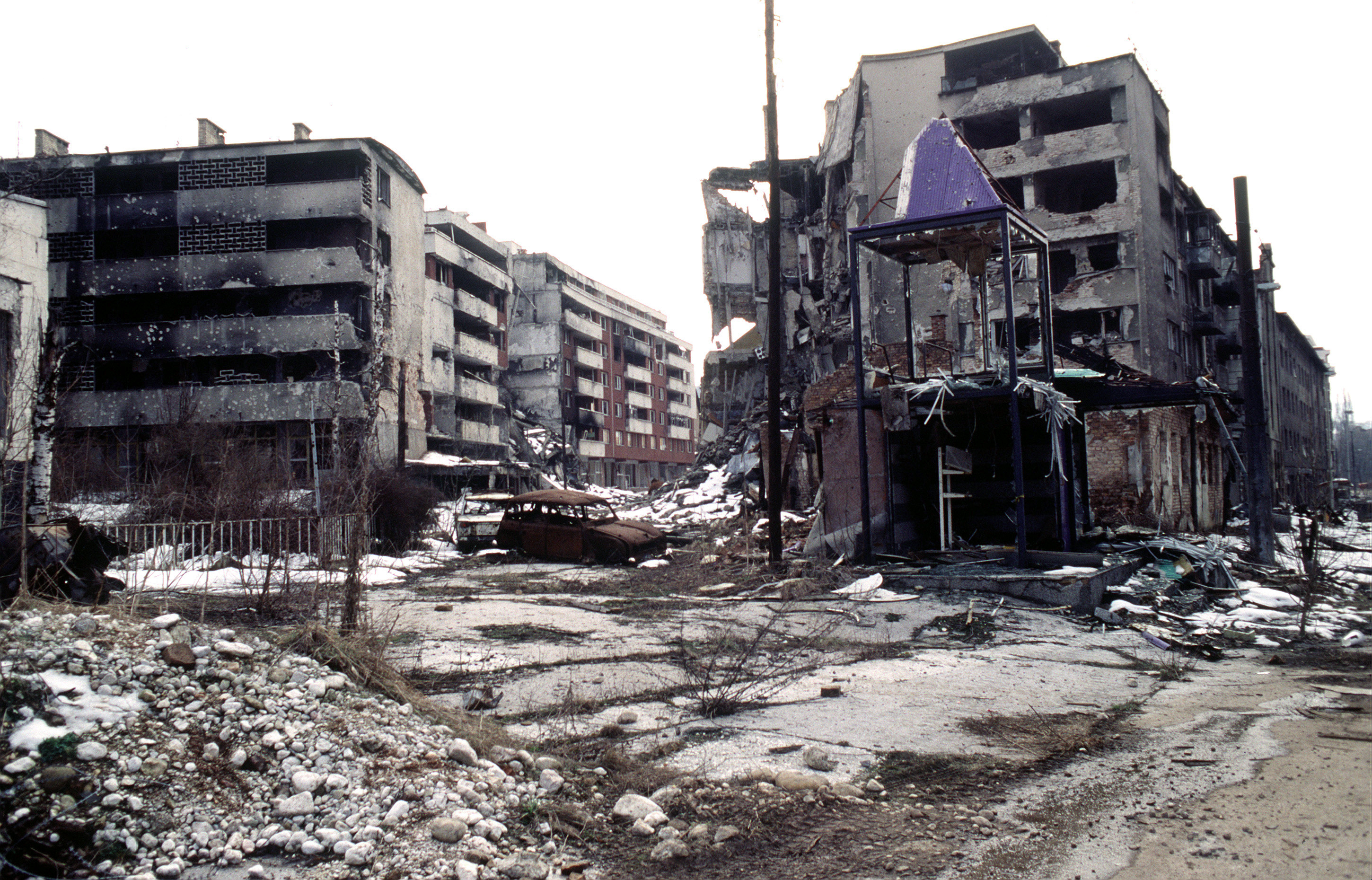
Heavily damaged apartment buildings in the Grbavica district of Sarajevo.

On 4 March United States Secretary of State James Baker urged the EEC to recognize Bosnia and Herzegovina, and on 6 March Izetbegović requested international recognition. On 10 March, a joint US-EEC declaration agreed on the recognition of Slovenia and Croatia. It also agreed that Macedonia and Bosnia and Herzegovina should be recognized if Bosnia and Herzegovina "adopt, without delay, constitutional arrangements that will provide for a peaceful and harmonious development of this republic within its existing borders." On 7 April the United States and the EEC recognized Bosnia and Herzegovina as an independent state, and other members of the international community also recognized the country in early April. That day, Bosnian Serb leaders declared independence and renamed their self-proclaimed entity the Republika Srpska. On 12 May, the Bosnian Serb Assembly adopted "Six Strategic Goals of the Serbian Nation"; Radovan Karadžić said, "The first such goal is separation of the two national communities – separation of states, separation from those who are our enemies and who have used every opportunity, especially in this century, to attack us, and who would continue with such practices if we were to stay together in the same state." On 22 May, Bosnia and Herzegovina was admitted to the United Nations.

Within a month of recognition, the siege of Sarajevo began, by which time the Bosnian Serb Army of Republika Srpska (VRS) controlled 70% of Bosnia and Herzegovina. The VRS were backed by Yugoslavia, and the Bosnian Army by the newly created Republic of Croatia as well as the unrecognized proto-state Herzeg-Bosnia.

The war lasted for three years, with over 100,000 casualties in total. The Bijeljina, Srebrenica and Markale massacres provoked widespread media coverage, and drew attention to the conflict.

== See also ==
- History of Bosnia and Herzegovina
- Foreign relations of Bosnia and Herzegovina
