= Mušan Topalović =

Bosnian war criminal and gangster (1957-1993)

Mušan Topalović Мушан Топаловић
- Born: 20 April 1957; Sarajevo, PR Bosnia and Herzegovina, FPR Yugoslavia
- Died: 26 October 1993 (aged 36); Sarajevo, Republic of Bosnia and Herzegovina
- Military career
- Allegiance: Republic of Bosnia and Herzegovina
- Service years: 1991–93
- Rank: Brigadier
- Nickname: Caco
- Unit: 10th Mountain Brigade
- Commands: Commander of the 10th Mountain Brigade of the 1st Corps
- Conflicts: Bosnian War: Siege of Sarajevo; Kazani pit killings; Operation Trebević 2 †

Mušan "Caco" Topalović (Serbo-Croatian Cyrillic: Мушан "Цацо" Топаловић; 20 April 1957 – 26 October 1993) was a Bosnian gangster and warlord from Sarajevo, commander of the 10th Mountain Brigade in the Army of the Republic of Bosnia and Herzegovina. Caco was also a smuggler, thief and gangster inside the besieged capital Sarajevo. Topalović was also formerly a rock musician.

Caco only became a brigade commander because of the confusion of the Yugoslav secession crisis in the spring of 1992. He managed to form his own brigade while the Bosnian government pursued a resolution. Caco and his forces were notorious for war crimes against the civilian population, particularly the killing of Serb civilians, many of whom were later exhumed from Kazani pit and identified.

== Activities and crimes ==
Topalović, nicknamed "Caco", was a pre-war rock musician and gangster who became the commander of the 10th Mountain Brigade in the Army of the Republic of Bosnia and Herzegovina at the outset of the war. Caco's brigade was infamous for rounding up Sarajevo's citizens and forcing them to dig defensive positions in his areas of responsibility. This included the family members of senior government officials and army generals. Some of those press-ganged into trench digging never returned, in some cases allegedly because Caco's men coveted their apartments. Caco's men are believed to have killed hundreds of victims, primarily local Serb civilians. The bodies were disposed of in Kazani, an illegal gravesite in a cleft of Mt. Trebević. Paramilitaries cut Serbs' throats and burned at least one Serb alive, according to testimonies. 29 bodies from the Kazani pit were exhumed by investigators after a few days of digging, but the work was abruptly halted by the Interior Ministry and never resumed. Caco's paramilitaries also assaulted foreign journalists, stole from aid agencies, hijacked armoured personnel carriers from UNPROFOR, and monopolized the black market.

== Death ==
The Sarajevo government began to crack down on the city's criminal army gangs in the fall of 1993. The city's military dependence on criminals had gradually diminished with the formation of a professional army and the gangs were an obstacle to further military professionalization and consolidation. Caco's excesses, brutal crimes against civilians and refusal to have the 10th Mountain Brigade fall under the Bosnian Army (ARBIH) chain of command had become a challenge to government authority, and had also become an embarrassment to Sarajevo's leaders who wished to maintain international sympathy and support. On October 26, 1993, the government launched "Operation Trebević 2" which targeted the 9th motorized and 10th mountain brigades and their respective commanders.

During the operation, Caco and a few of his associates killed nine police officers. In the attempt to arrest him, police officers Admir Hebib (1969–93), Kemal Kojić (1960–93), Dragan Miljanović (1967–93), Slaven Markešić (1965–93), Srđan Bosiljčić (1963–93), Elvir Šovšić (1974–93), Hamid Humić (1959–93), Jasmin Čamdžija (1968–93), Izet Karšić (1959–93) were killed. Caco also took several dozen civilians as hostages; eight of them were killed. Caco later surrendered after receiving guarantees from the Presidency that he would not be killed. He ended up dead.

In the official version of the event issued by the Government, Caco was killed while attempting escape. Caco's brother Emir, brother-in-law Behudin and another soldier were arrested and beaten, but were released at the time. Several members of his brigade were later charged with war crimes in Sarajevo courts. 14 soldiers were eventually convicted of various atrocities after a secret trial, with most serving sentences of a few months.

According to Munir Alibabić, Central Security Service Director for the Bosnian government during the Siege of Sarajevo, Caco was eliminated not because he was an out-of-control commander but because he had become a political liability for Alija Izetbegović and his inner circle: Caco knew too much and could implicate SDA political leaders who were accomplices in his dirty work.

== Funeral ==
Caco was buried in a grave marked N.N. close to the Sarajevo Olympic Stadium. In 1996, under pressure from various groups, the Bosnian government revealed the location of his grave, and his remains were exhumed. On 2 December 1996 he was given a war hero's burial which was broadcast on television and attended by approximately 12,000 people in Sarajevo, mostly members of the Green Berets and other quasi-formal military formations. Caco's public funeral was condemned by Jovan Divjak, an ethnic Serb who was an army general for the Bosnian army during the war, as the "glorification of a gangster". He wrote to President Izetbegović: "I cannot understand, why, in the days when you are making superhuman efforts to preserve Bosnia as it is, you organize the funeral of those who inflicted the greatest harm. Is this funeral not a sign to all of those who violated the laws? A sign that they can come pillage the houses, steal cars and the belongings of others without impunity?". Divjak had on May 27, 1993——four months before Caco's arrest——denounced Caco's crimes in a letter to the general staff and Izetbegović. Caco was buried in the cemetery for soldiers killed during the war. This was condemned by many veterans and families of fallen ones, as he never fought on the front line, nor did any of the men under his direct command.

== See also ==
- Ismet Bajramović
- Ramiz Delalić
- Jusuf Prazina
