= UDIK =

Bosnian non-governmental organization

Association for Social Research and Communication
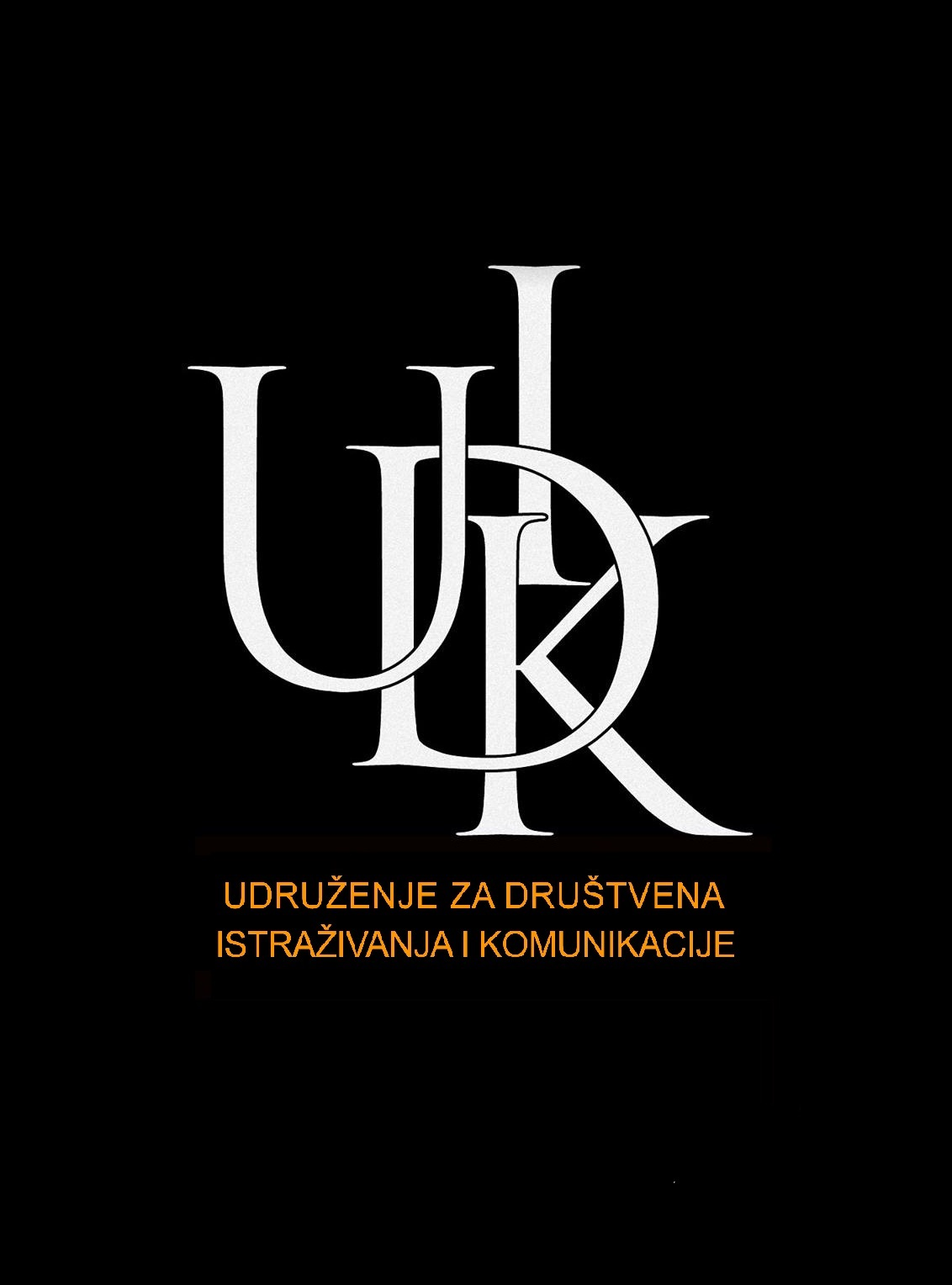
- Formation: 2013; 13 years ago
- Type: Nonprofit; NGO
- Purpose: Human rights
- Headquarters: Sarajevo, Bosnia and Herzegovina
- Region served: territories of former Socialist Federal Republic of Yugoslavia
- Product: nonprofit human rights advocacy
- Coordinator: Edvin Kanka Ćudić
- Affiliations: RECOM Reconciliation Network (2013–)
- Website: www.udik.org

UDIK (Serbo-Croatian Cyrillic: УДИК), officially known as the Association for Social Research and Communication (Serbo-Croatian: Udruženje za društvena istraživanja i komunikacije/ Удружење за друштвена истраживања и комуникације), is a Bosnian non-governmental organization founded in 2013. It documents genocide, war crimes, and human rights violations in Bosnia and Herzegovina and other parts of the former former Yugoslavia.

== Human rights activities ==
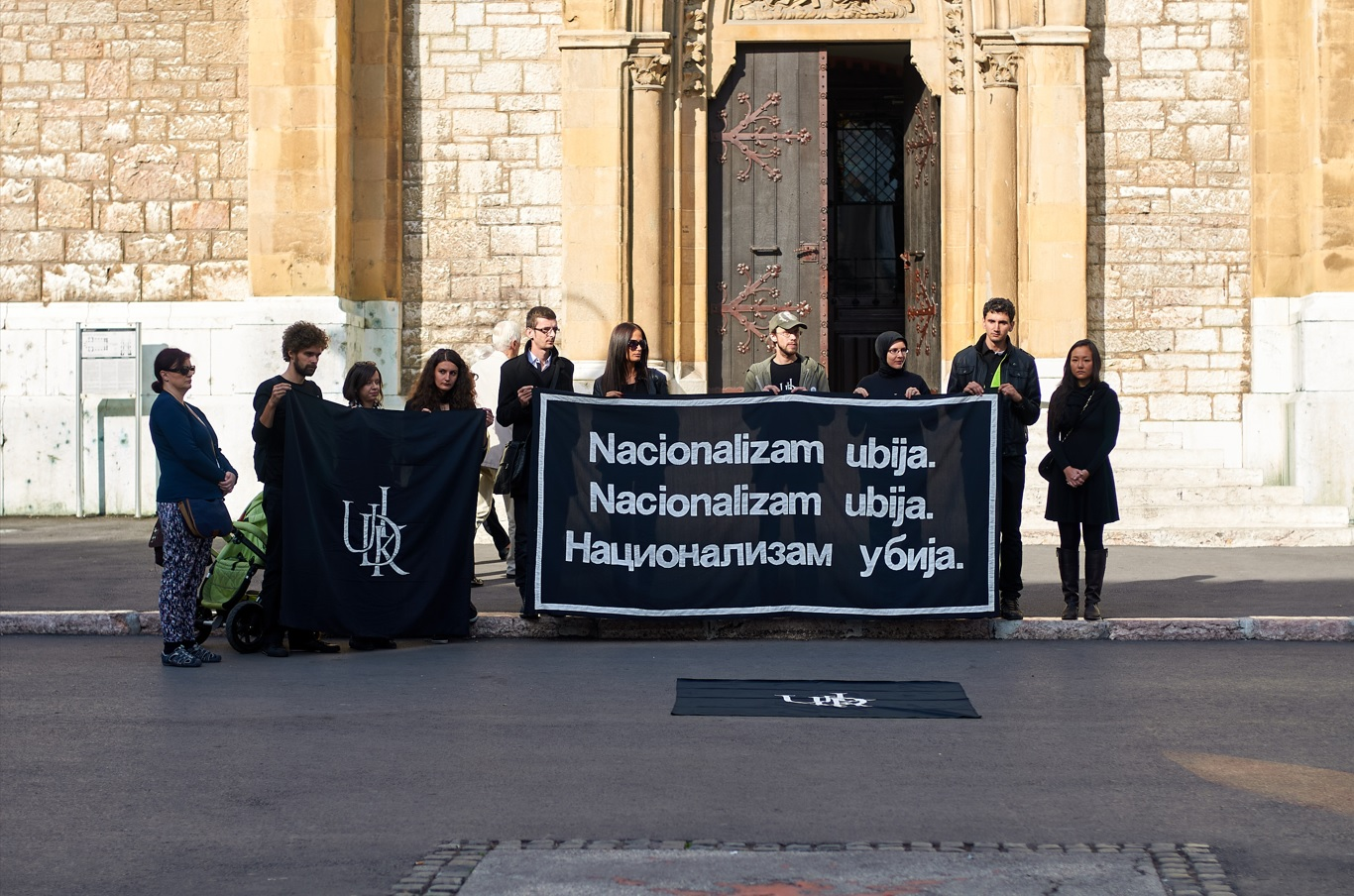
The slogan Nacionalizam ubija (Nationalism kills) is used by UDIK in its public activities.

Founded in 2013 by Edvin Kanka Ćudić, UDIK documents genocide, war crimes, and human rights violations in Bosnia and Herzegovina and other parts of the former Yugoslavia. The organization works across national borders to support the rule of law in post-conflict societies and address past human rights abuses. Its transitional justice programme focuses on three main areas:

- Documenting
- Justice and institutional reform
- Memorialization

UDIK's members include intellectuals and professionals from various academic disciplines.

=== Other activities ===
Since its establishment, UDIK has advocated for women's and LGBT rights. The organization has also spoken publicly about the vulnerability of marginalized communities in Bosnia and Herzegovina, particularly LGBT people and Roma. In 2019, UDIK expressed support for Bosnia and Herzegovina's first LGBT Pride Parade, held in Sarajevo.

== Research and documentation ==
=== Publications about war crimes ===
Locations about which UDIK has published extensively on subjects such as war crimes, massacres and human rights violations of the Bosnian war (1991-1995)

UDIK publishes research and documentation on war crimes, massacres, and human rights violations committed during the Bosnian War. Its publications examine war crimes and other human rights violations in Foča, Višegrad, Sarajevo's Grbavica, Trusina, Sarajevo's Kazani, Sanski Most, Bugojno, Grabovica, Sijekovac, Vlasenica, Zaklopača, Biljani, and Čajniče. In 2020, UDIK published a book listing victims of the Srebrenica genocide buried between 2003 and 2019.

=== Central register of memorials ===
In 2016, UDIK published the first results of its Central Register of Memorials in Bosnia and Herzegovina, documenting more than 2,100 memorials dedicated to victims of the Bosnian War. In 2017, the organization published a register documenting more than 1,200 memorials in Croatia dedicated to victims of the Homeland War. In 2018, it published registers covering more than 300 memorials in Serbia and Montenegro associated with the Serbia and Montenegro in Yugoslav wars.

=== Controversial memorials ===
Since 2017, UDIK has published studies examining controversial memorials erected after 1991 in the former Yugoslavia. The studies cover memorials in Bosnia and Herzegovina, Croatia, Montenegro, and Serbia, including monuments dedicated to Draža Mihailović, Alojzije Stepinac, and Josip Broz Tito.

=== Memorials to foreigners in Bosnia and Herzegovina ===
In 2026, UDIK published a study on memorials in Bosnia and Herzegovina dedicated to foreign nationals killed during the war, including journalists, humanitarian workers, diplomats, and soldiers.

== Memorialization initiatives ==
Locations where UDIK organized commemorations to the victims of the Yugoslav wars (1991-2001)

Since 2013, UDIK has organized commemorations for victims of the wars in the former Yugoslavia (1991–2001) as part of its Living monument initiative. The commemorations have taken place in Bosnia and Herzegovina (Sarajevo, Tuzla, Brčko, Zenica, Višegrad, and Foča), Croatia (Zagreb and Vukovar), and Serbia (Belgrade and Prijepolje). They have commemorated crimes against Bosniaks, Serbs, and Croats civilians.

=== Kazani (Sarajevo) ===
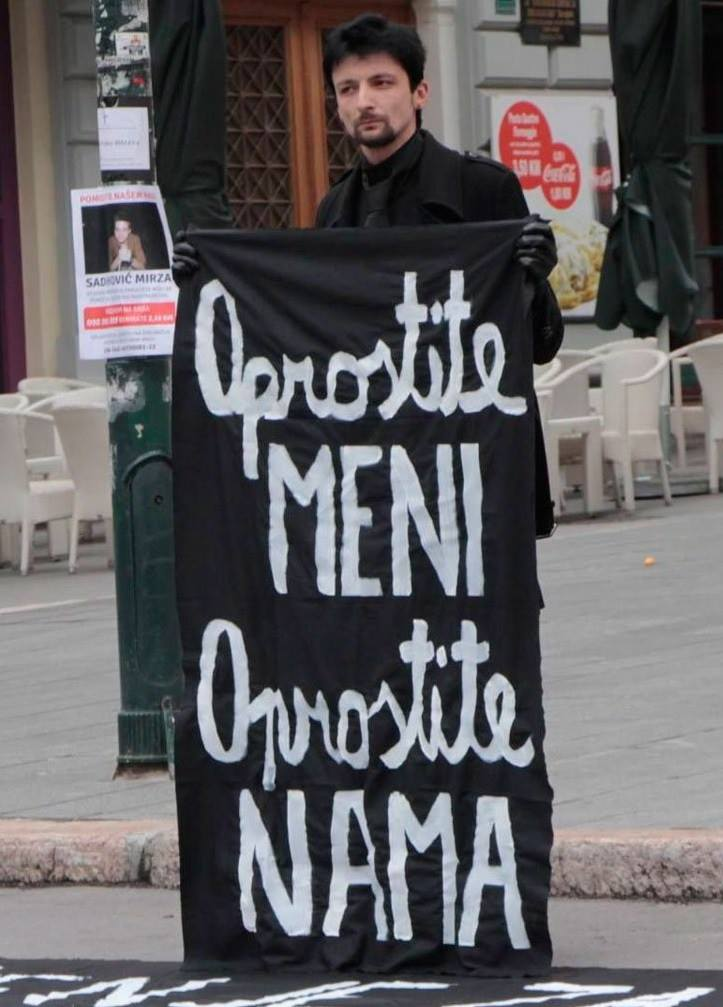
Edvin Kanka Ćudić at the UDIK commemoration for Kazani in front of the Cathedral on October 25, 2014

Since 2014, UDIK has advocated for a memorial to the victims of the Kazani massacre in Sarajevo. UDIK was the first non-governmental organization to commemorate the victims of the killings. Its commemorations have taken place in front of the Sarajevo Cathedral.

Since 2017, UDIK has called for memorials to the victims to be established both at Kazani on mount Trebević and in Sarajevo's city center. The organization has argued that a memorial in the city center would make the victims' commemoration more accessible to the public.[40][41] In 2020 and 2021, the initiative received support from civil society organizations, intellectuals, and representatives of victims, according to published reports.

Sarajevo's city authorities instead proceeded with plans for a memorial at Kazani. In September 2021, the Sarajevo City Council put forward a proposal for the memorial. UDIK subsequently called for the memorial to identify those responsible for the killings and to indicate that the number of victims was not final. According to media reports, mayor Benjamina Karić rejected these requests.

The memorial at Kazani was unveiled in November 2021 by Mayor Benjamina Karić. No representatives of the victims were present at the opening, according to published reports.

=== St. Joseph Cemetery (Sarajevo) ===
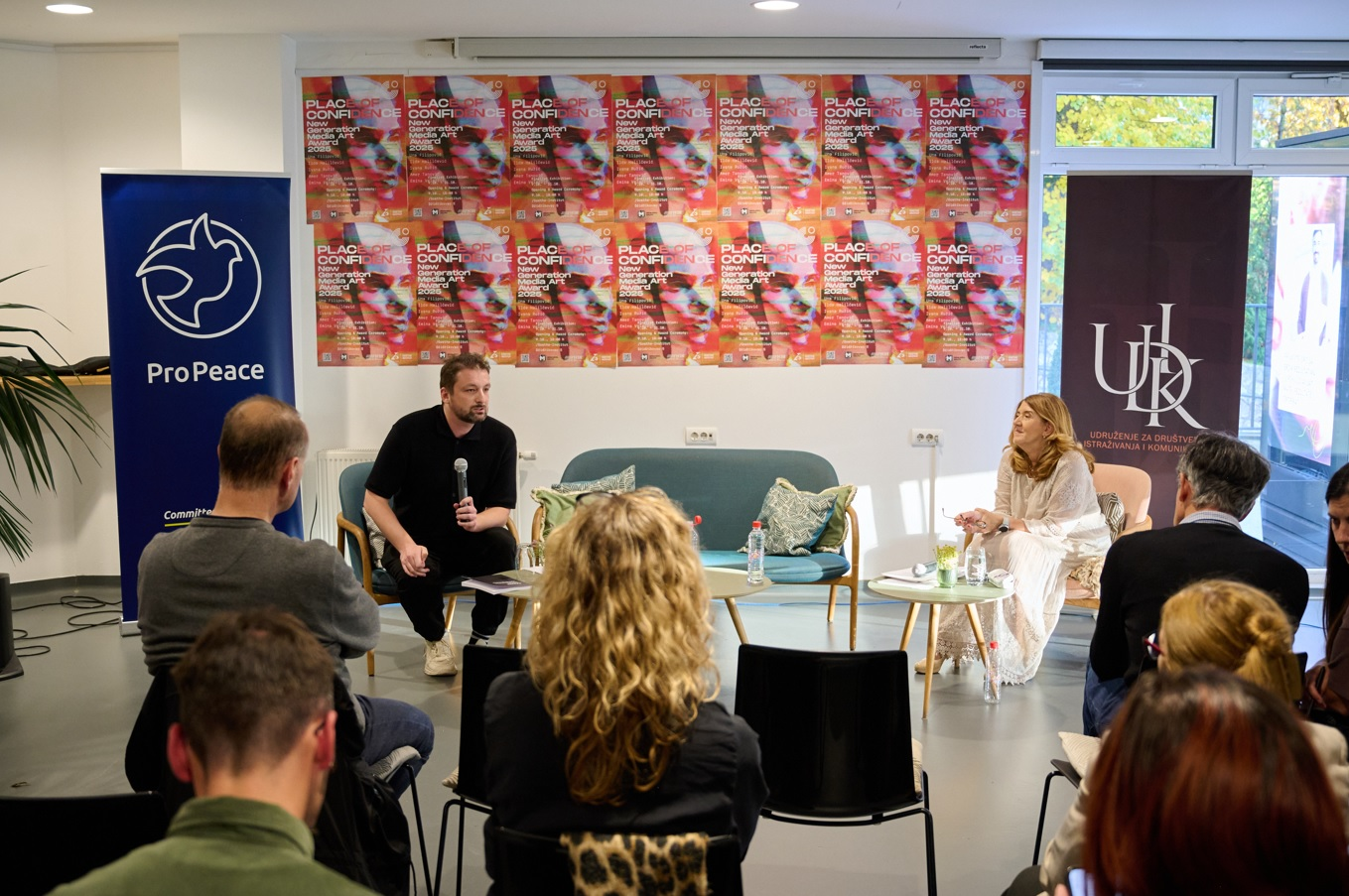
Round table in Sarajevo on the occasion of the anniversary of Kazani, organized by UDIK on October 25, 2025.

Since April 2022, UDIK has advocated for the installation of a memorial plaque at St. Joseph Cemetery in Sarajevo to commemorate Serbian victims whose remains were exhumed from Kazani, Gaj, and Grm Maline and subsequently buried at the cemetery. After the cemetery authorities rejected the initiative in 2022, UDIK brought it before the Sarajevo City Council, which rejected it in both 2023 and 2024.

=== Storm and Ahmići (Zagreb) ===
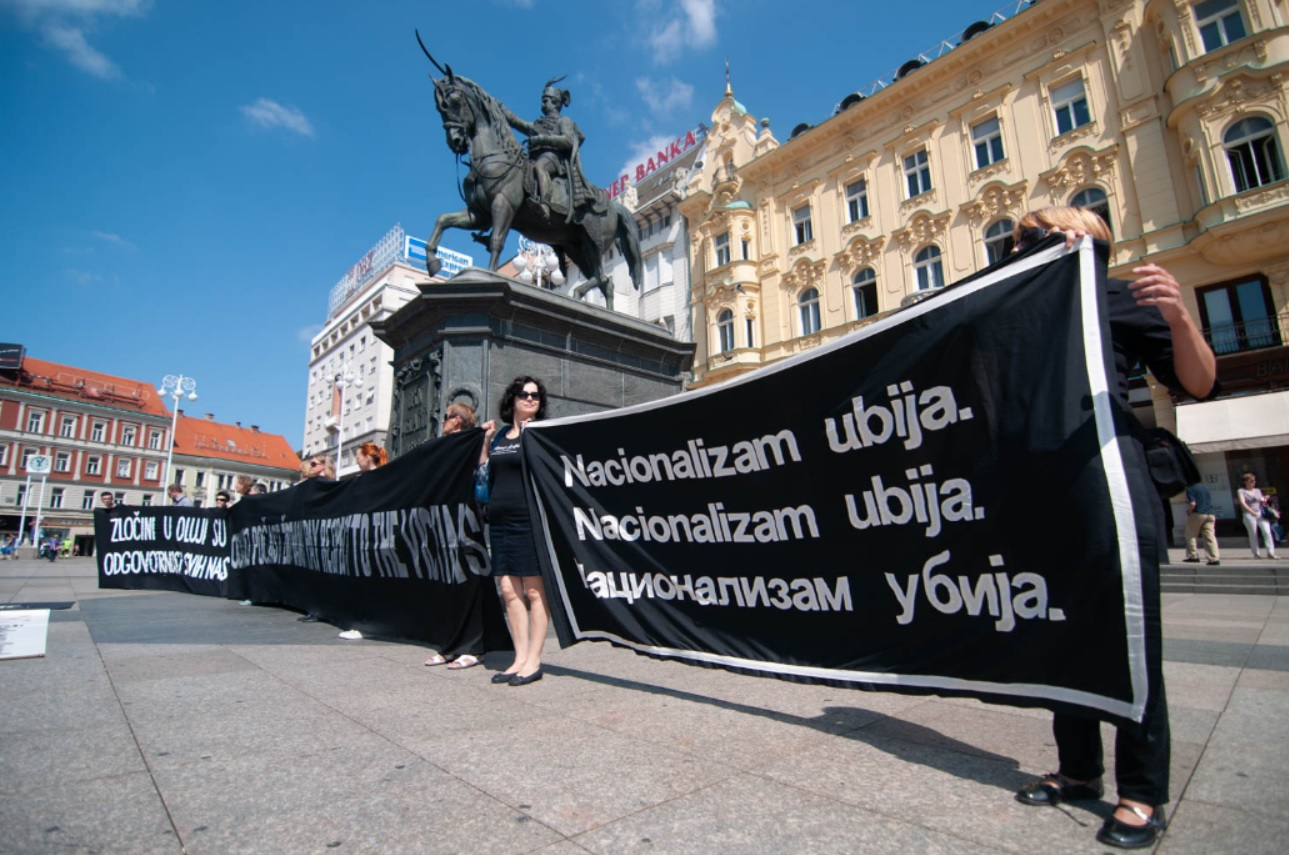
Commemoration "The crimes in the Operation Storm are the responsibility of all of us", Zagreb 2014

In 2014, UDIK and the Centre ROSA, based in Zagreb, launched the campaign "The Crimes in Operation Storm Are the Responsibility of All of Us" to commemorate Serb victims of crimes committed during Operation Storm in Croatia. In 2015, the Federal Ministry of Interior of the Bosnia and Herzegovina banned the planned commemoration in Sarajevo. In 2016, Croatian authorities also banned the commemoration, but it was held in Zagreb under increased police security. In July 2026, the Constitutional Court of Croatia ruled that the 2016 ban on the commemoration was unconstitutional, finding that it violated Centre ROSA's right to freedom of peaceful assembly.

In 2022, UDIK and Centre ROSA initiated a coalition to commemorate the victims of the massacre in Ahmići. The coalition's first activity took place in Zagreb on the anniversary of the massacre that year. In 2023, the network expanded to include several other Croatian NGOs. On 4 April, seven organizations submitted a request to the City of Zagreb to name a square after the victims of the Ahmići massacre.

=== Zanatski Center (Brčko) ===
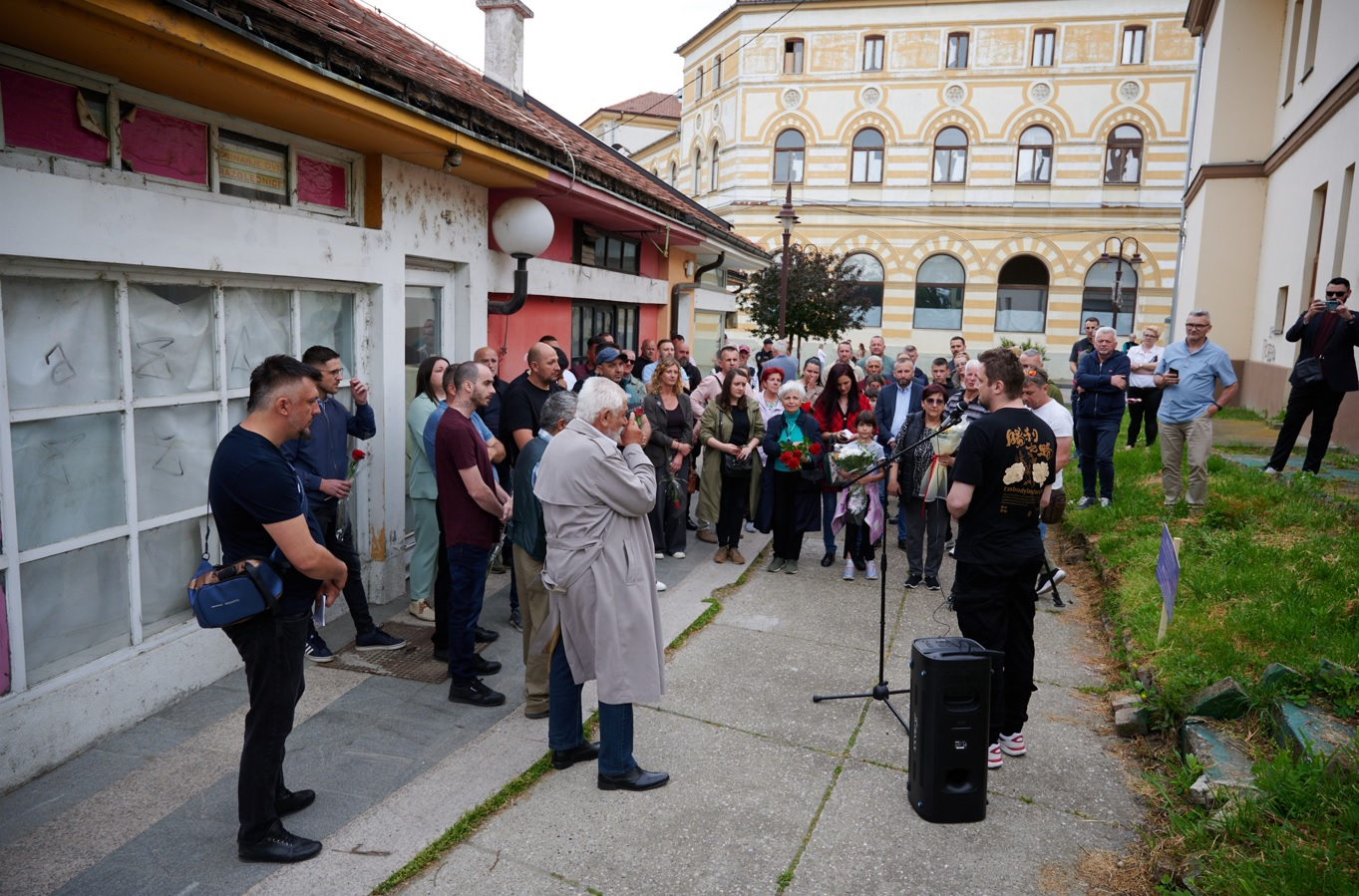
Commemoration in the Zanatski Center in Brčko, organized by UDIK on May 7, 2026

In May 2023, UDIK launched an initiative to install a memorial plaque at the site where Hajrudin Muzurović and Husein Kršo were killed in Brčko. In May 1992, both civilians were executed by Goran Jelisić at the Zanatski Center. The executions were photographed. UDIK submitted a request for a memorial plaque to the Assembly of the Brčko District. According to UDIK, the request received no response.

In March 2024, UDIK submitted another request for a memorial plaque to the mayor of Brčko and the president and Assembly of the Brčko District. On 7 May 2024, UDIK representatives and members of the Muzurović and Kršo families laid flowers at the site. According to UDIK, this was the first commemoration held at the site in Zanatski Center.

=== Vilina Vlas (Višegrad) ===
On 13 March 2026, UDIK and the Center for Civic Education (CCE), based in Podgorica, launched an initiative calling on Montenegro's Pension and Disability Insurance Fund (PIO) to terminate its contract with the Vilina Vlas Hotel and Spa in Višegrad. The initiative followed media reports that Montenegrin pensioners were being sent to the hotel for rehabilitation. UDIK and CCE stated that "many guests who come to Vilina Vlas today do not know that they are sleeping in rooms and on beds where mass rapes and murders were committed just thirty years ago."

On 20 March 2026, Montenegro's Ministry of Social Protection, Family Care and Demography announced that the Pension and Disability Insurance Fund had unilaterally terminated its cooperation agreement with the Vilina Vlas rehabilitation center in Višegrad on 16 March. The ministry stated that the fund's current management had not been involved in signing the original agreement in 2016 and had been unaware of the site's historical context. On 23 March, UDIK and CCE welcomed the decision.

On 24 April 2026, UDIK and CCE called on the Education Union of Montenegro (SPCG) to terminate its cooperation with Vilina Vlas. The appeal followed reports that the union's members had been offered discounted rates for stays at the hotel. On 27 April, SPCG terminated its cooperation with the rehabilitation center in Višegrad. UDIK and CCE welcomed the decision.

== Bibliography ==
Publications published by UDIK:

=== In Serbo-Croatian ===
- Ratni zločini u Brčkom ('92-'95): presude (Sarajevo, 2016)
- In memoriam Centar Sarajevo (1992-1995) (Sarajevo, 2016)
- Ratni zločin na Kazanima: presude (Sarajevo, 2016, 2020)
- In memoriam Bosna i Hercegovina (1992-1995), vol. 1 (Sarajevo, 2016)
- Ratni zločin u Trusini: presude (Sarajevo, 2017)
- Ratni zločini u Višegradu: presude, vol. 1-3 (Sarajevo, 2017, 2025, 2026)
- Ratni zločini u Foči: presude (Sarajevo, 2017)
- In memoriam Republika Hrvatska (1991-1995), vol. 1 (Brčko-Sarajevo, 2017)
- Građanska memorijalizacija u Bosni i Hercegovini i Republici Hrvatskoj (Sarajevo, 2017)
- Od Jugoslavije do Dejtona - Spomenici i kultura sjećanja kroz uticaj društveno-političkih sistema: Priručnik za predavače historije/istorije/povijesti (Sarajevo, 2017)
- Ratni zločini na Grbavici: presude (Sarajevo, 2017)
- Ratni zločini u Sanskom Mostu: presude (Sarajevo, 2017)
- In memoriam Crna Gora i Republika Srbija, vol. 1 (Brčko-Sarajevo, 2018)
- Spomenici i politike sjećanja u Bosni i Hercegovini i Republici Hrvatskoj: kontroverze (Sarajevo, 2018)
- Putevima sjećanja: fotografski prikazi memorijalizacije u Bosni i Hercegovini (Sarajevo, 2019)
- Ratni zločin u Grabovici: presude (Sarajevo, 2019)
- Ratni zločin u Sijekovcu, predmet: Zemir Kovačević (Sarajevo, 2019)
- Ratni zločini u Milićima i Vlasenici: presude (Sarajevo, 2019)
- Nestali, sjećanja i mediji u postdejtonskoj Bosni i Hercegovini i regionu (Sarajevo, 2020)
- Ratni zločin u Biljanima, predmet: Marko Samardžija (Sarajevo, 2020)
- Izvještaj Vlade Republike Srpske o događajima u i oko Srebrenice od 10. do 19. jula 1995. (Sarajevo, 2020)
- Srebrenica: 25 godina sjećanje na žrtve genocida (Sarajevo, 2020)
- Ratni zločini u Čajniču: presude (Sarajevo, 2020)
- Sarajevo: sjećanje na žrtve holokausta (Sarajevo, 2021)
- Ratni zločini u Bugojnu: presude (Sarajevo, 2021)
- Ratni zločini u Bugojnu, predmet: Nisvet Gasal i drugi, vol. 1-2 (Sarajevo, 2022)
- Kultura sjećanja i strategije reprezentacije ratne prošlosti devedesetih u Bosni i Hercegovini, Hrvatskoj i Srbiji (Sarajevo, 2022)
- Spomenici i politike sjećanja u Srbiji i Crnoj Gori: kontroverze (Sarajevo, 2022)
- Selektivna memorijalizacija u Bosni i Hercegovini: pokušaji etnonacionalističkih politika da prekrajaju historiju i diktiraju politiku sjećanja i identiteta kroz spomenike i memorijalne komplekse (Sarajevo, 2023) − Dino Jozić
- Ratni zločin u kasarni "Viktor Bubanj" u Sarajevu, predmet: Ramiz Avdović i drugi (Sarajevo, 2023)
- Medijsko izvještavanje o ratnim dešavanjima devedesetih na primjerima Srebrenice i Vukovara (Sarajevo, 2024)
- Ratni zločini u Doboju: presude, vol. 1-2 (Sarajevo, 2024)
- Srebrenica: tri decenije poslije genocida (Sarajevo, 2025)
- Kazani: suđenja, (re)ekshumacije, memorijalizacija (Sarajevo, 2025)
- Otmica u Štrpcima: presude (Sarajevo, 2026)
- Dejtonska Bosna i Hercegovina: tri decenije krhkog mira (Sarajevo, 2026)

=== Translations into English ===
- In Memoriam Bosnia and Herzegovina (1992-1995), vol. 1 (Sarajevo, 2016)
- In Memoriam Republic of Croatia (1991-1995), vol. 1 (Brčko-Sarajevo, 2017)
- In Memoriam Montenegro and Republic of Serbia, vol. 1 (Brčko-Sarajevo, 2018)
- Monuments and the politics of memory in Bosnia and Herzegovina and Croatia: controversies (Sarajevo, 2018)
- Selective Memorialization in Bosnia and Herzegovina: Attempts of ethno-nationalist policies to rewrite history and dictate the politics of memory and identity through monuments and memorials (Sarajevo, 2023) − Dino Jozić

== Notable associates ==
Notable contributors have included:

- Amir Duranović, PhD
- Amra Čusto
- Dino Jozić
- Dženan Skelić, PhD
- Edin Radušić, PhD
- Emza Fazlić
- Ibro Čavčić
- Igor Bencion Kožemjakin
- Jusuf Hafizović
- Lejla Čengić
- Ljubinka Petrović-Ziemer, PhD
- Marijana Stojčić
- Matea Jerković
- Mladen Obrenović, PhD
- Nemanja Stjepanović
- Nerzuk Ćurak, PhD
- Vildana Selimbegović
- Vjeran Pavlaković, PhD

== Public debate over memorialization ==
UDIK's activities concerning the documentation and commemoration of war crimes have sometimes been the subject of public debate. Its work on the Kazani killings, including calls for the memorial to identify the perpetrators and provide greater historical context, has formed part of wider debates about the commemoration of wartime atrocities in Bosnia and Herzegovina. These debates have addressed the wording of memorials, the identification of victims and perpetrators, and the interpretation of wartime events.
