= 1991 Bosnian Serb referendum =

Referendum in Bosnia and Herzegovina

A referendum on remaining in Yugoslavia was held in the parts of Bosnia and Herzegovina with a significant Serb population on 10 November 1991. The referendum was organised by the Bosnian Serb Assembly and asked two questions; to Serbs it asked:

Do you agree with the decision of Assembly of the Serbian people in Bosnia and Herzegovina of October 24, 1991, that the Serbian people should remain in a common Yugoslav state with Serbia, Montenegro, the SAO Krajina, SAO Slavonija, Baranja and Western Srem, and with others who have come out for remaining?

Non-Serbs were asked:

Are you agreed that Bosnia and Herzegovina, as an equal republic, should remain in a common state of Yugoslavia with all others who take this position?

It was approved by 98% of voters, and Republika Srpska was subsequently established on 9 January 1992.

== Results ==
| Question | For | | Against | | Invalid/ blank | Total votes | Registered voters | Turnout | Result |
| Question | Votes | % | Votes | % | Invalid/ blank | Total votes | Registered voters | Turnout | Result |
|---|---|---|---|---|---|---|---|---|---|
| Remaining of all Serbs in Yugoslavia | 1,161,146 | 98.00 | | 2.00 | | | 1,550,000 | 85.00 | Approved |
| Bosnia-Herzegovina to remain in Yugoslavia | 48,845 | 98.00 | | 2.00 | | | 1,550,000 | 85.00 | Approved |
Source: Direct Democracy

== Aftermath ==
The Bosnian government declared the referendum unconstitutional. It later held a nationwide independence referendum between 29 February and 1 March 1992, which was in turn boycotted by most of the Serbs. Steven L. Burg and Paul S. Shoup interpreted the question in the plebiscite, which asked voters to stay in a "common state with Serbia, Montenegro, the SAO Krajina, SAO Slavonija, Baranja and Western Srem, and Serb Autonomous Regions" as promoting, in effect, a Greater Serbia.

== Books ==
- Burg, Steven L.; Shoup, Paul S. (2015). Ethnic Conflict and International Intervention: Crisis in Bosnia-Herzegovina, 1990-93: Crisis in Bosnia-Herzegovina. Routledge. ISBN 9781317471011.
- Nettelfield, Lara J. (2010). Courting Democracy in Bosnia and Herzegovina. Cambridge, England: Cambridge University Press. ISBN 978-0-521-76380-6. LCCN 2010002815.

== Other ==
- "Prosecutor vs. Radovan Karadžić – Judgement" (PDF). International Criminal Tribunal for the Former Yugoslavia. 26 March 2016.
