= Naser Kelmendi =

Bosnian drug trafficker of Kosovo Albanian descent

Naser Kelmendi (born 15 February 1957 in Peć, Kosovo) is a Bosnian drug trafficker of Kosovo Albanian descent.

== Career ==
In 1976 he served time in prison for attempted murder. He then moved to Bosnia and Herzegovina in the 1990s, and established his criminal operations in Sarajevo. While in the city, he greatly expanded his criminal network, being linked to criminals such as Safet "Sajo" Kalic, a suspected Montenegrin drug trafficker, but also maintaining contacts with important businessmen, including developer Fahrudin Radončić, owner of Dnevni avaz, Bosnia's largest circulation newspaper. His criminal activities included not only drug trafficking but also cigarette smuggling, money laundering and loan sharking.

In 2008 Bosnian police produced a report on Kelmendi to Interpol, revealing his vast influence in the country's drug trafficking rings. Despite this, as reported by the Organized Crime and Corruption Reporting Project, Kelmendi and his sons still were allowed to retain legal weapon permits. According to Interpol, Kelmendi imported gold and textiles clandestinely from Turkey to Kosovo in the 1980s, and later, after the former Yugoslavia was placed under international sanctions, he smuggled oil, tobacco and drugs. Kelmendi first came to international public scrutiny as a result of being the main suspect for the murder of his rival Ramiz Delalić, a Bosnian criminal and warlord who was the main perpetrator of the murder of Nikola Gardović, during his son's wedding on 1 March 1992, considered the first murder of the Bosnian War.

After initially fleeing to Montenegro, Kelmendi was arrested by the Kosovo Police in Pristina on 6 May 2013. Since Bosnia and Herzegovina does not recognize Kosovo, and thus has no extradition agreement with it, Kelmendi was tried in Pristina for crimes that he was alleged to have committed in Bosnia and Herzegovina. In February 2018, Kelmendi was sentenced to six years in prison for drug trafficking in Kosovo.

In August 2018, the Kosovo Appeals Court dismissed the case against Kelmendi and ordered a retrial, after which Kelmendi was released pending the beginning of a new trial. In May 2023, Kelmendi was once again found guilty of drug trafficking and sentenced to four years and eight months in prison.

On July 2, 2009 Kelmendi's son, Elvis Kelmendi, received one-year probation for an assault conviction. Elvis Kelmendi was later re-arrested in July 2022 by Bosnian police for drug trafficking.
