= Ramiz Delalić =

Bosnian mobster (1963–2007)

Ramiz Delalić Рамиз Делалић
- Born: 15 February 1963; Priboj, PR Serbia, FPR Yugoslavia
- Died: 27 June 2007 (aged 44); Sarajevo, Bosnia and Herzegovina
- Military career
- Allegiance: Republic of Bosnia and Herzegovina
- Branch: Army of the Republic of Bosnia and Herzegovina
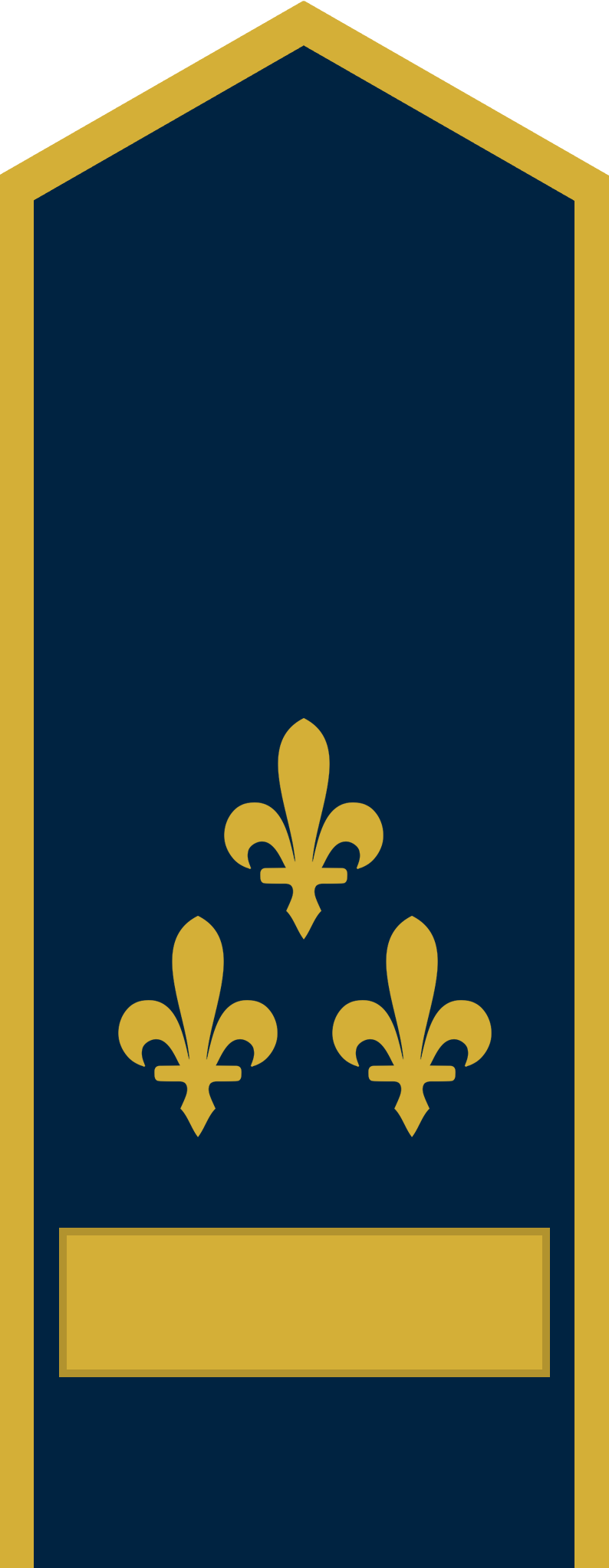
- Rank: Brigadier
- Nickname: Ćelo
- Unit: 9th Mountain Brigade (1st Corps)
- Commands: Commander of 9th Mountain Brigade of the 1st Corps
- Conflicts: Bosnian War: Siege of Sarajevo

Ramiz Delalić (Serbo-Croatian Cyrillic: Рамиз Делалић; 15 February 1963 – 27 June 2007), widely known by his nickname Ćelo (Serbo-Croatian Cyrillic: Ћело, Serbo-Croatian pronunciation: [tɕelo] (Note: The word means "baldy" - a common nickname in Sarajevo for criminals, because their heads were shaven during their time spent in prison)), was a Bosnian underworld figure and wartime ARBiH officer who commanded Sarajevo’s 9th Brigade. Delalić gained notoriety as the main suspect who stood trial before a local court for the killing of Nikola Gardović on 1 March 1992, but was killed in 2007 before the trial concluded.

== Activities ==
Ramiz Delalić and Mušan "Caco" Topalović were among several Sarajevo underworld figures who became involved in the city’s early wartime defence structures. Delalić was associated with the ARBiH 9th Motorised Brigade, while Topalović commanded the 10th Mountain Brigade. The 9th Brigade was formed as a result of the merging of the 3rd and 7th Mountain Brigade. Delalić is described as its deputy commander under Suljo Imsirović, although he was informally considered at times to be its commander.

Both formations later gained reputations for criminality and lack of discipline; the ICTY Halilović case referred to the 9th and 10th Brigades as having “notorious reputations for being criminal and uncontrolled in behaviour.” In addition to guarding key positions on Mount Trebević, their gangs "requisitioned" private vehicles; kidnapped men to dig trenches at the front; murdered, raped and robbed with impunity.

In October 1993, Bosnian authorities moved against these rogue command structures during "Operation Trebević 2" and Delalić was jailed on charges connected to his unit’s criminal activity in Sarajevo.

== Sarajevo wedding attack ==
On 1 March 1992, a Bosnian Serb wedding procession in front of the Old Church in Sarajevo's old quarter of Baščaršija was attacked, resulting in death of the father of the groom, Nikola Gardović, and the wounding of a Serbian Orthodox priest Radenko Mirović. Delalić was identified by eyewitnesses as the alleged shooter. Although a warrant was reportedly issued shortly after the attack, Delalić was not charged until 8 December 2004, when he was indicted for first degree murder in relation to the wedding attack. Delalić was shot and killed by unidentified gunmen in Sarajevo before the completion of his trial.

== Death ==
Delalić was gunned down at the entrance to his apartment building in the center of Sarajevo, on 27 June 2007. The killer waited for Delalić and fired at him on two occasions, each time with multiple shots. Immediately after the shooting, an ambulance arrived, though doctors pronounced Delalić dead shortly after. Police believed the murder was organized by Naser Kelmendi, a Kosovo-born drug trafficker and Delalić's rival. Delalić was buried in the Kovači Cemetery, Sarajevo.

== See also ==
- Ismet Bajramović
- Mušan Topalović
- Jusuf Prazina
