= Ismet Bajramović =

Bosnian soldier (1966 - 2008)

- Born: 26 April 1966; Sarajevo, SR Bosnia and Herzegovina, SFR Yugoslavia
- Died: 17 December 2008 (aged 42); Sarajevo, Bosnia and Herzegovina
- Military career
- Allegiance: Bosnia and Herzegovina
- Branch: Army of Bosnia and Herzegovina
- Service years: 1992–1993
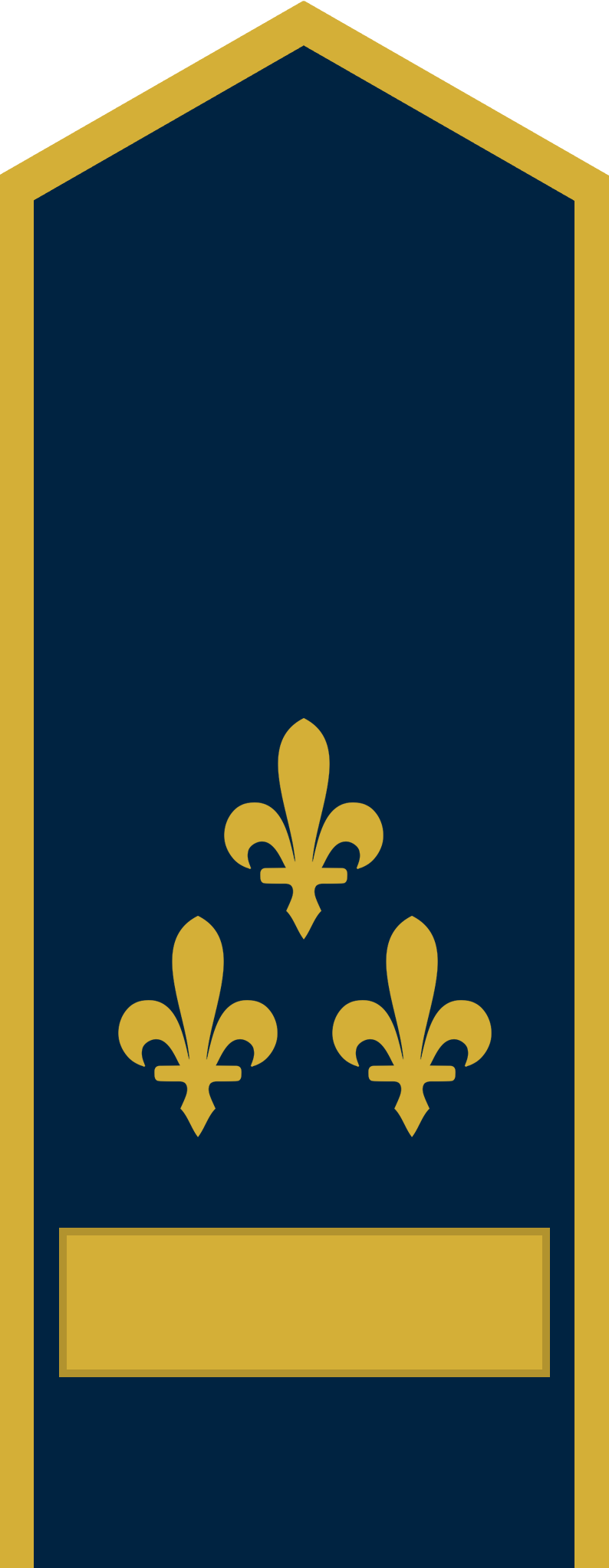
- Rank: Brigadier
- Nickname: Ćelo
- Commands: Head of Military Police of Sarajevo
- Conflicts: Bosnian War; Siege of Sarajevo (WIA)

Ismet "Ćelo" Bajramović (26 April 1966 – 17 December 2008) was a Bosnian soldier and reputed organized crime figure from Sarajevo. During the war in Bosnia and Herzegovina and specifically the siege of Sarajevo, Bajramović was one of the gangsters who played a key role in the defense of the city in the early days of the war.

== Biography ==
Bajramović was born in Sarajevo. Prior to the war he was a petty criminal who spent time in prison. After his release, Ćelo rose to become the most powerful gangster in Sarajevo and was dubbed the "Godfather of Sarajevo" by The New York Times in 1993.

When the war began, criminal groups were among the first to resist the Yugoslav People's Army besieging Sarajevo. Ćelo was put in charge of the Dobrinja neighborhood. At the same time, he was head of the military police of Sarajevo and responsible for the central prison. While commanding military police actions, he also engaged in smuggling, racketeering and cross-frontline trading. In the fall of 1993 Bajramović was shot near the heart by a sniper. He was evacuated from the city and returned in 1997.

During the war he was profiled by The New York Times and Vanity Fair magazine. He also appeared in an episode of the PBS program Frontline on the story of Romeo and Juliet in Sarajevo which aired in 1994.

In the post-war years, Bajramović was often arrested on various charges; in April 2000, he was arrested for murder and spent four years in prison until his conviction was overturned. Meanwhile, Bajramović's health began to decline as a result of the bullet wound to the heart. He suffered a tachycardia and was frequently hospitalized as a result. On 17 December 2008, Bajramović committed suicide by shooting himself in the temple in his Sarajevo home. His declining health, especially after his sister had died a month earlier, was cited as the motive for the suicide, according to his friends and lawyer.
