= Rape during the Bosnian War =

Use of rape as a military strategy during the Bosnian War

Rape during the Bosnian War concerns the mass systemic sexual violence mainly targeted against women and girls, but in some instances against males. While people from all ethnic groups committed rape, the vast majority of rapes were perpetrated by Bosnian Serb forces of the Army of the Republika Srpska (VRS) and Serb paramilitary units, who used rape as an instrument of terror and a key tactic in their programme of ethnic cleansing. Estimates of the number of women raped during the war range between 10,000 and 50,000 and of male victims of sexual violence as 3,000. Accurate numbers are difficult to establish and it is believed that the number of unreported cases is much higher than reported ones.

The International Criminal Tribunal for the former Yugoslavia (ICTY) declared that "systematic rape" and "sexual enslavement" in time of war was a crime against humanity, second only to the war crime of genocide. Although the ICTY did not treat the mass rapes as genocide, many have concluded from the organised, and systematic nature of the mass rapes of the female Bosniak (Bosnian Muslim) population, that these rapes were a part of a larger campaign of genocide, and that the VRS were carrying out a policy of genocidal rape against the Bosnian Muslim ethnic group.

The trial of VRS member Dragoljub Kunarac was the first time in any national or international jurisprudence that a person was convicted of using rape as a weapon of war. The widespread media coverage of the atrocities by Serbian paramilitary and military forces against Bosniak women and children, drew international condemnation of the Serbian forces. Following the war, several award-winning documentaries, feature films and plays were produced which cover the rapes and their aftermath.

== Background ==
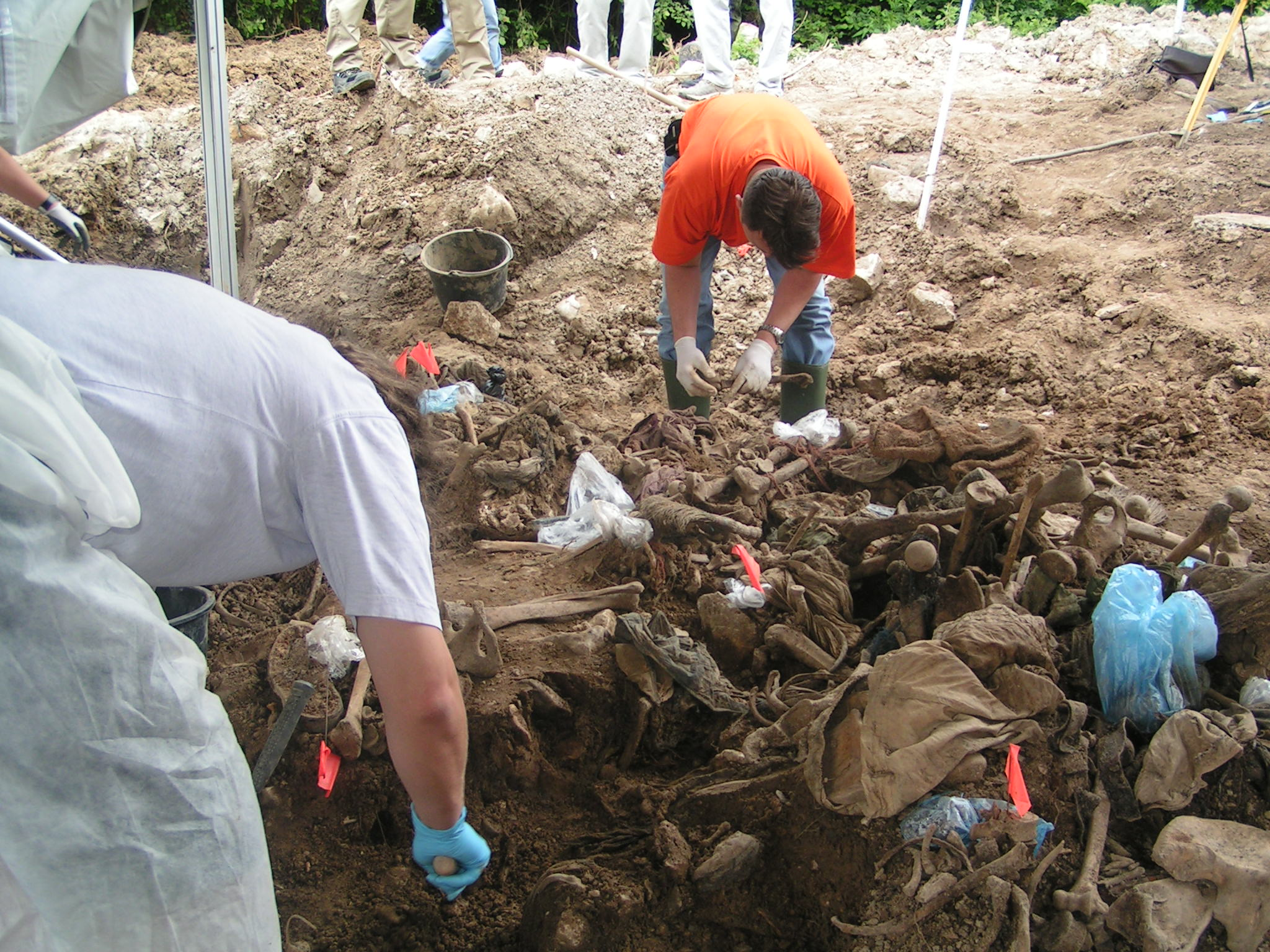
Excavation of a mass grave in eastern Bosnia. Civilian men from Foča were executed whilst women were detained and repeatedly raped by members of the Bosnian Serb armed forces.

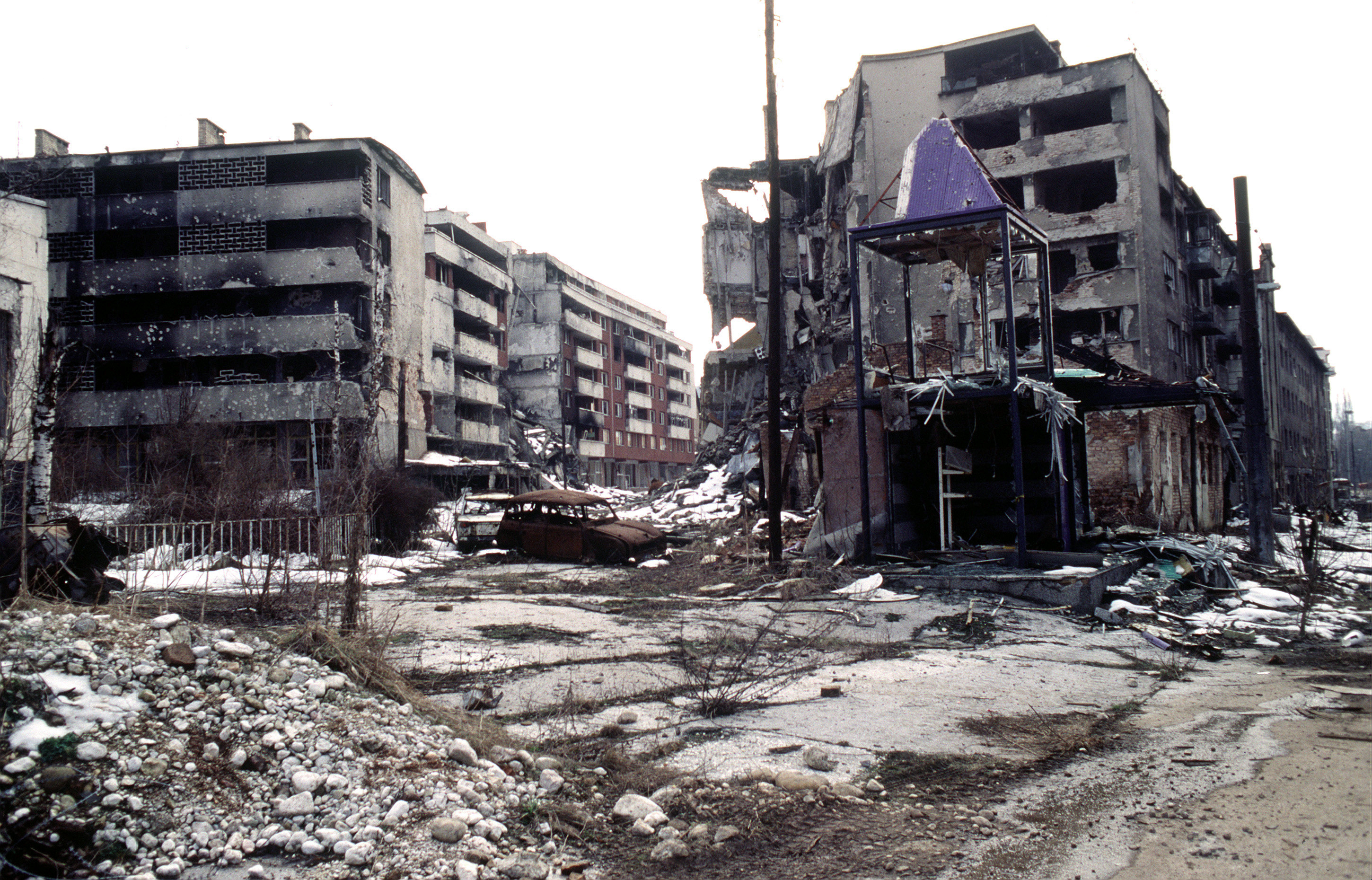
The war-torn Sarajevo neighborhood of Grbavica in 1996, a site of rape camps during the Bosnian War and subject of the award-winning film Grbavica.

The Bosnian War was the first time that mass rape was recognised and prosecuted by an international tribunal.

Genocidal rape is a feature of campaigns which involve ethnic cleansing and genocide, as the objective is to destroy or forcefully remove the target population, and ensure they do not return. According to Amnesty International, the use of rape during times of war is not a by-product of conflicts, but a pre-planned and deliberate military strategy. The first aim of these mass rapes is to instill terror in the civilian population, with the intent to forcibly dislocate them from their property. The second aim is to reduce the likelihood of return and reconstitution by inflicting humiliation and shame on the targeted population. Historians such as Niall Ferguson have assessed a key factor behind the high-level decision to use mass rape for ethnic cleansing as being misguided nationalism.

The Socialist Federal Republic of Yugoslavia was not at its inception a platform for internal nationalist sentiment. Individuals who sought to ignite tensions risked imprisonment, torture or execution. Then, in 1989, Serbian president, Slobodan Milošević inflamed Serbian nationalist sentiment with the Gazimestan Speech which referred to the Battle of Kosovo. Feelings of victimhood and aggression towards Bosniaks were further stirred up with exaggerated tales about the role played by a small number of Bosniaks in the persecution of Serbs by the Ustaše during World War II.

Serb propaganda suggested that Bosniaks had Turkish ancestry. Despite the Serbian government-led hate campaigns, some Serbs tried to defend Bosniaks from the atrocities and were threatened, including instances when troops announced by loudspeaker that "every Serb who protects a Muslim will be killed immediately".

Before the conflict began, Bosniaks in Eastern Bosnia had already begun to be removed from their employment, to be ostracised and to have their freedom of movement curtailed. At the outset of the war, Serb forces began to target the Bosniak civilian population. Once towns and villages came under Serbian control, the military, the police, the paramilitaries and, sometimes, even Serb villagers continued these attacks. Bosniak houses and apartments were looted or razed to the ground, the civilian population were rounded up, some were physically abused or murdered during the process. Men and women were separated and then held in concentration camps.

== Occurrence of rape ==
=== Estimates ===
Estimates of the number of women and girls raped range from 12,000 to 50,000, the vast majority of whom were Bosniaks raped by Bosnian Serbs. The ICTY estimates between 20,000 and 50,000 rapes, and that 80% of those happened over a prolonged period of imprisonment. UNHCR experts have claimed 12,000 rapes. The European Union estimates a total of 20,000, while the Bosnian Interior Ministry claims 50,000. The UN Commission of Experts identified 1,600 cases of sexual violence.

=== As ethnic cleansing ===
On 6 October 1992, the United Nations Security Council established a Commission of Experts chaired by M. Cherif Bassiouni. According to the commission's findings, it was apparent that rape was being used by Serb forces systematically, and had the support of commanders and local authorities. (Note: "In Bosnia, some of the reported rape and sexual assault cases committed by Serbs, mostly against Muslims, are clearly the result of individual or small group conduct without evidence of command direction or an overall policy. However, many more seem to be a part of an overall pattern whose characteristics include: similarities among practices in non-contiguous geographic areas; simultaneous commission of other international humanitarian law violations; simultaneous military activity; simultaneous activity to displace civilian populations; common elements in the commission of rape, maximizing shame and humiliation to not only the victim, by also the victim's community; and the timing of the rapes. One factor in particular that leads to this conclusion is the large number of rapes which occurred in places of detention. These rape in detention do not appear to be random, and they indicate at least a policy of encouraging rape supported by the deliberate failure of camp commanders and local authorities to exercise command and control over the personnel under their authority.") The commission also reported that some perpetrators said they were ordered to rape. Others said that the use of rape was a tactic to make sure the targeted population would not return to the area. The assailants told their victims they would bear a child of the assailant's ethnicity. Pregnant women were detained until it was too late to have the fetus aborted. Victims were told they would be hunted down and killed should they report what had transpired. The commission also concluded that: "Rape has been reported to have been committed by all sides to the conflict. However, the largest number of reported victims have been Bosniaks, and the largest number of alleged perpetrators have been Bosnian Serbs. There are few reports of rape and sexual assault between members of the same ethnic group."

The team of European Community investigators, including Simone Veil and Anne Warburton, similarly concluded in their 1993 report that rape carried out by the Bosnian Serb forces was not a secondary effect of the conflict but part of a systematic policy of ethnic cleansing and was "perpetrated with the conscious intention of demoralizing and terrorizing communities, driving them from their home regions and demonstrating the power of the invading forces". Amnesty International and Helsinki Watch also concluded during the conflict that rape was being used as a weapon of war, with the primary purpose being to cause humiliation, degradation, and intimidation to ensure the survivors would leave and never return.

=== Rape camps ===
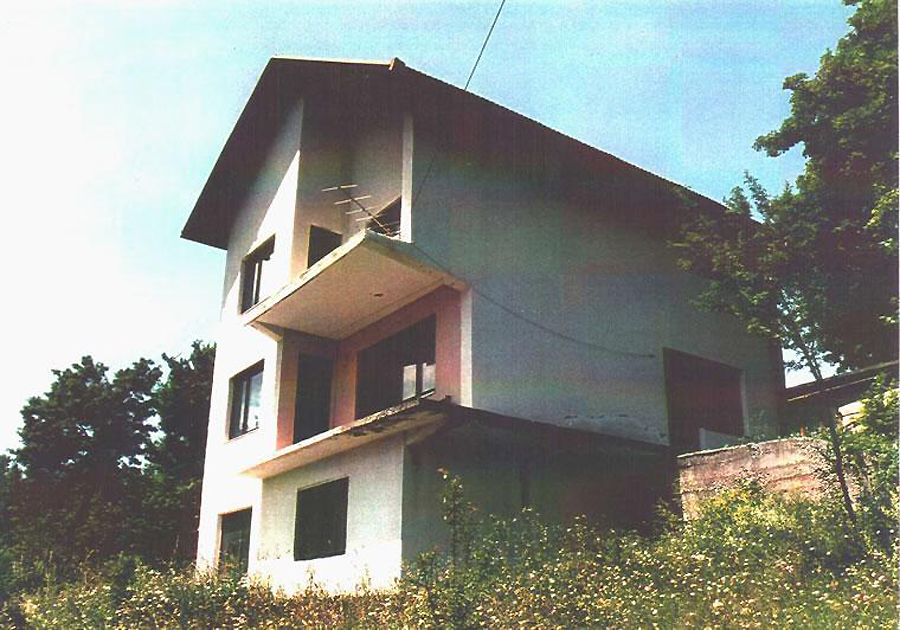
"Karaman's House", a location where women were tortured and raped near Foča, Bosnia and Herzegovina. (Photograph provided courtesy of the ICTY)

Throughout the conflict, women of all ethnic groups were affected, although not on the scale that the Bosniak population suffered. Serb forces set up "rape camps" where women were imprisoned, tortured and raped over a period of years. Women held at the camps were only released when pregnant. Gang rape and public rapes in front of villagers and neighbors were not uncommon. Many of the reports of the abuses illustrated the ethnic dimension of the rapes. These camps were located at Keraterm, (Note: "At Keraterm camp, a number of guards raped a female inmate on a table in a dark room until she lost consciousness. The next morning she found herself lying in a pool of blood.") Vilina Vlas, Manjača, Omarska, Trnopolje, Uzamnica and Vojno. In May 1992, Serb villagers from Snagovo, Zvornik, surrounded and captured the village of Liplje and turned it into a concentration camp. Four hundred people were imprisoned in a few houses and those held there were subject to rape, torture and murder.

Testimony from a Kalinovik camp survivor (where roughly 100 women had been detained and subjected to "multiple perpetrator rape") said that the rapists continually told their victims, "You are going to have our children. You are going to have our little Chetniks", and that the reason for their being raped was to "plant the seed of Serbs in Bosnia". Women were forced to go full term with their pregnancies and give birth. A Serbian national song Marš na Drinu was played over the loudspeaker signalling to the women that rapes and assaults were imminent. The age of the victims ranged from 12 to 60 and often women were targeted from the same family group. Many women were also physically assaulted during the rapes, sometimes severely.

Over a five-month period between the spring and summer of 1992, between 5,000 and 7,000 Bosniaks and Croats were held in inhumane conditions at Omarska. At the concentration camp, rape, sexual assaults and torture of men and women were commonplace. One newspaper described the events there as "the location of an orgy of killing, mutilation, beating and rape". Rape, murder and physical abuse were commonplace. At the Trnopolje camp an unknown number of women and girls were raped by Bosnian Serb soldiers, police officers and the camp guards. At the Uzamnica camp, one witness in the trial of Oliver Krsmanović, charged with crimes relating to the Višegrad massacres, claimed that the male detainees were at one time forced to rape women.

Detention camps were set up across the Serb-controlled town of Foča. While kept at one of the town's most notable rape locations, "Karaman's house", Bosniak females, including minors as young as 12, were repeatedly raped. During the trial of Dragoljub Kunarac et al., the conditions of these camps were described as being "intolerably unhygienic". Women and girls selected by Kunarac, or by his men, were taken to the soldiers' base and raped. The local police were accused of involvement, and the head of the police in Foča, Dragan Gagović, was identified as being one of the men who would visit these camps to select women for rape. (Note: Women were kept in various detention centres where they had to live in intolerably unhygienic conditions, where they were mistreated in many ways including, for many of them, being raped repeatedly. Serb soldiers or policemen would come to these detention centres, select one or more women, take them out and rape them ... All this was done in full view, in complete knowledge and sometimes with the direct involvement of the local authorities, particularly the police forces. The head of Foča police forces, Dragan Gagović, was personally identified as one of the men who came to these detention centres to take women out and rape them.) At least 11 persons were indicted in connection with rapes at the camps in Foča.

At other times, girls were removed from detention centres and kept in various locations for prolonged periods of time or trafficked and sold under conditions of slavery. Radomir Kovač, who was also convicted by the ICTY, personally kept four girls in his apartment, abusing and raping three of them many times, while also allowing acquaintances to rape one of the girls. Prior to selling three of the girls, Kovač appointed two of them to other Serb soldiers who abused them for more than three weeks.

Croat forces set up concentration camps at Čelebići, Dretelj, Gabela, Rodoč, Kaonik, Vitez, and Žepa. At the joint Bosniak-Croat run Čelebići facility, Serb civilians were subjected to various forms of torture and sexual abuse, including rape. At Dretelj the majority of prisoners were Serbian civilians, who were held in inhumane conditions, while female detainees were raped and told that they would be held until they gave birth to an "Ustaša". Both Serbian and Bosniak civilians were held at the Heliodrom camp in Rodoc, and detainees were reported to have been sexually assaulted. Serbian women and girls were raped and tortured in Bosniak-run brothels in Sarajevo.

In Doboj, Bosnian Serb forces separated the females from the males and then facilitated the rape of some women by their own male family members. Women were questioned about male relatives in the city, and one woman's fourteen-year-old son was forced to rape her.

=== Men and boys ===
A lesser known form of rape during the war was that which was perpetrated against men and boys. Though no concrete number has been determined, it has been estimated that some 3,000 were raped during the conflict. However, it is assumed that many victims have not come forward due to their deaths or the stigma associated with sexual abuse. Many male victims were found to have been ostracised from their communities, often feeling stripped of their masculinity or being accused of homosexuality. Other victims feared that coming forward would result in further abuse.

A majority of the instances took place in detention camps, others happened elsewhere, including during home raids. The range of abuse varied widely. Some victims were sexually tortured, while others were forced to torture fellow prisoners. Acts included forced oral and anal sex, genital mutilation, and blunt trauma to the genitals.

Reasons for these crimes mainly revolved around the humiliation and the assertion of dominance over victims rather than the sexual satisfaction of the perpetrators. The trauma resulting from these crimes included a range of mental and physical health problems including feelings of hopelessness, flashbacks, erectile dysfunction, orgasmic dysfunction, and coital pain.

== Aftermath ==
Following the end of hostilities with the 1995 Dayton Agreement, there have been sustained efforts to reconcile the opposing factions. Much attention has been paid to the need to understand the reality of what happened during the war, dispel myths, and for responsible leaders to be brought to justice and be encouraged to accept their guilt for the mass rapes and other atrocities.

In the aftermath of the conflict, ethnic identity is now of much greater social importance in Bosnia than it was prior to 1992. From the 1960s until the beginning of the war, nearly twelve per cent of marriages were mixed (between members of different communities), and young citizens would often refer to themselves as Bosnians rather than identifying their ethnicity. After the conflict it has been effectively mandatory to be identified as either Bosniak, Serb or Croat and this has been a problem for the children of rape victims as they come of age.

A medical study of 68 Croatian and Bosniak victims of rape during the 1992–1995 war found that many suffered psychological problems as a result. None had any psychiatric history prior to the rapes. After the rapes 25 had suicidal thoughts, 58 suffered depression immediately after and 52 were still suffering from depression at the time of the study, one year later. Of the women 44 had been raped more than once and 21 of them had been raped daily throughout their captivity. Twenty-nine of them had become pregnant and seventeen had an abortion. The study reached the conclusion that the rapes had "deep immediate and long-term consequences on the mental-health" of the women.

Rape in the Bosnian war, was used as a "weapon of war", which affected the communal consciousness of general Bosnian public. As Pierre Bayard puts it, "[i]n Bosnia the rapes not only accompanied the advance of the Serbian armies, they were also the result of a concerted policy of cultural eradication." In other words, the rape itself served as an instrument of strategic desecration of Bosnian and/or Bosniak identity and anything related to it.

In the study entitled "Mass Rape: The War Against Women in Bosnia-Herzegovina", Alexandra Stiglmayer et al. conclude:

In Bosnia-Herzegovina and Croatia, rape has been an instrument of 'ethnic cleansing'. The UN Commission of experts that investigated the rapes in former Yugoslavia has concluded. 'Rape cannot be seen as incidental to the main purpose of the aggression but as serving a strategic purpose in itself,' reports the European Community mission concerned especially with the situation of Bosniak women. The report of the humanitarian organization Amnesty International states: 'Instances that have included sexual infringements against women are apparently part of an inclusive pattern of war conduct characterised by massive intimidation and infringements against Bosniaks and Croats.' The American human rights organization Helsinki Watch believes that rape is being used as a 'weapon of war' in Bosnia-Herzegovina: ' Whether a woman is raped by soldiers in her home or is held in a house with other women and raped over and over again, she is raped with a political purpose – to intimidate, humiliate, and degrade her and others affected by her suffering. The effect of rape is often to ensure that women and their families will flee and never return.' Against this background, it is obvious that rapes in Bosnia-Herzegovina are taking place 'on a large scale' (UN and EC), that they are acquiring a systematic character, and that 'in by far the most instances Muslim (Bosniak) women are the victims of the Serbian forces' (Amnesty International). Estimates of the number of rape victims range from 20,000 (EC) to 50,000 (Bosnian Ministry of the Interior).

== National and international reactions ==
In August 1992 media stories publicised the use of rape as a war strategy, and one of the first to bring it to the world's attention was Newsday correspondent Roy Gutman's programme Mass Rape: Muslims Recall Serb Attacks, which aired on 23 August 1992.

The United Nations Security Council established the ICTY in response to the conflict's human rights violations. Article 5 of the ICTY charter clarified that the tribunal had the power to prosecute war crimes, and the charter specifically condemned rape as a crime, for which people could be indicted.

A Central Intelligence Agency report leaked in 1995 stated that Serb forces were responsible for 90 per cent of the atrocities committed during the conflict. A report compiled by a team of experts for the UN, chaired by M. Cherif Bassiouni, reached the same conclusion, calculating that Croat forces were responsible for six per cent of the atrocities and Bosniak forces for four per cent.

After the fall of Srebrenica in July 1995, Madeleine Albright, the U.S. Ambassador to the United Nations, told the UN Security Council that "[the] whereabouts of some 6,000 Bosniak men and boys from Srebrenica was unknown. But their fate was not. We have enough information to conclude now, however, that the Bosnian Serbs beat, raped, and executed many of the refugees."

== Legal proceedings ==
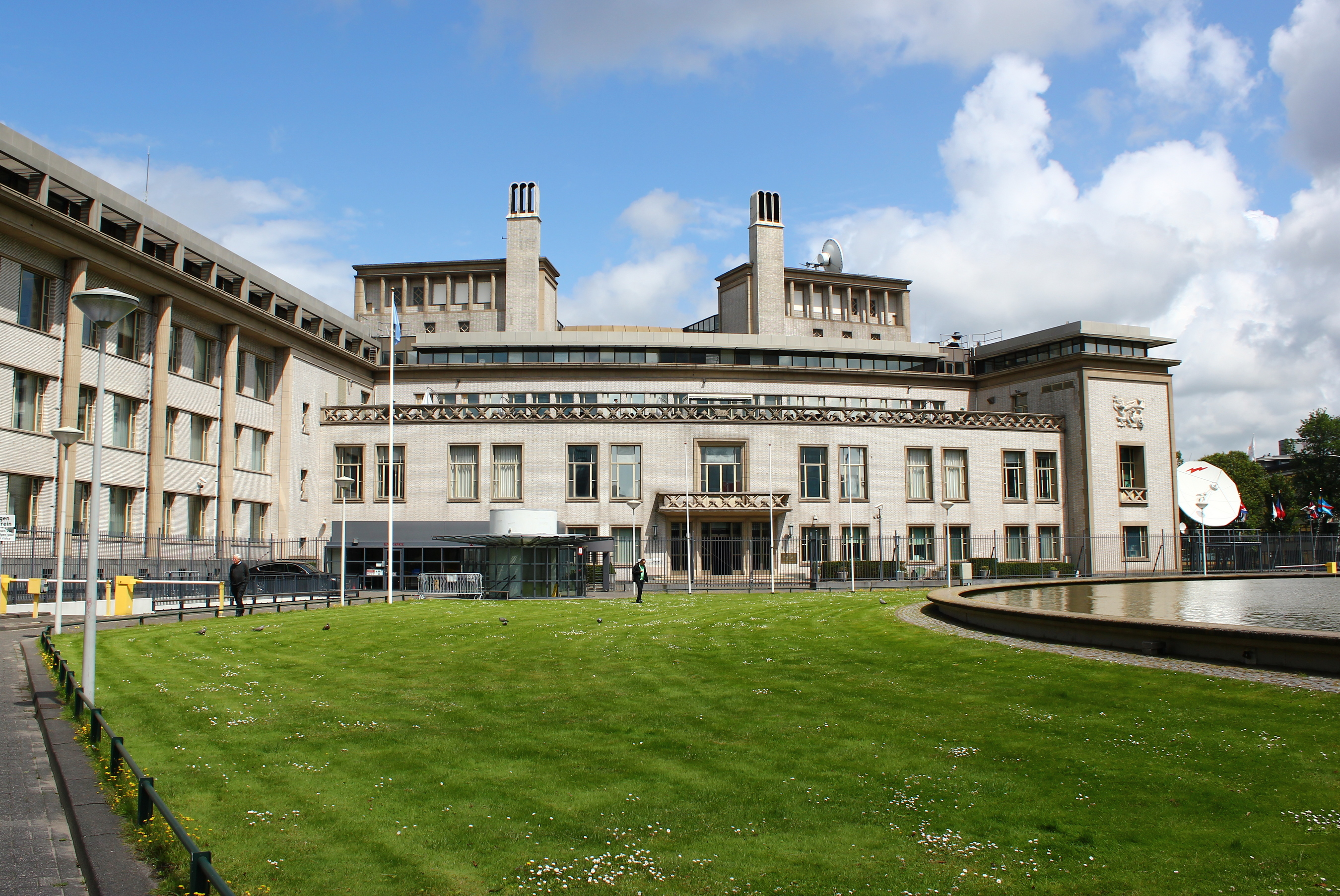
The Tribunal building in The Hague.

In the early 1990s, calls were made for legal action to be taken over the possibility of genocide having occurred in Bosnia. The ICTY set the precedent that rape in warfare is a form of torture. By 2011, it had indicted 161 people from all ethnic backgrounds for war crimes, and heard evidence from over 4,000 witnesses. In 1993, the ICTY defined rape as a crime against humanity, and also defined rape, sexual slavery, and sexual violence as international crimes which constitute torture and genocide.

Judges from the ICTY ruled during the trial of Dragoljub Kunarac, Radomir Kovač and Milorad Krnojelac that rape had been used by the Bosnian Serb armed forces as an "instrument of terror". Kunarac was sentenced to 28 years' imprisonment for rape, torture and enslaving women. Kovač, who had raped a 12-year-old child and then sold her into slavery, was sentenced to 20 years imprisonment and Krnojelac to 15 years. The ICTY declared that a "hellish orgy of persecution" had occurred in various camps across Bosnia.

In 1997, Radovan Karadžić was sued by Bosniak and Croat women in an American court for genocidal rape. He was found liable. The plaintiffs were found to be victims of genocidal rape, and awarded 745 million dollars in damages.

On 26 June 1996, the ICTY indicted Dragan Zelenović on seven counts of rape and torture as crimes against humanity, and seven counts of rape and torture as violations of the customs and laws of war. Zelenović initially plead not guilty, but during a hearing on 17 December 2007, the trial chamber accepted a guilty plea on three counts of torture and four counts of rape as crimes against humanity. Zelenović had taken part in the sexual assaults of women at various camps, including the gang rape of a 15-year-old girl and an adult woman. He was given a 15-year sentence for crimes against humanity, which he appealed. The appeal chamber upheld the original sentence.

On 10 March 1997, in what is best known as the Čelebići case, Hazim Delić, Zejnil Delalić, Zdravko Mucić and Esad Landžo were put on trial. They were charged under article 7(1) (Note: "A person who orders an act or omission with the awareness of the substantial likelihood that a crime will be committed in the execution of that order, has the requisite mens rea for establishing liability under article 7(1) pursuant to ordering, Ordering with such awareness has to be regarded as accepting that crime.") and article 7(3) (Note: "A superior may be held responsible for the crimes of his subordinates, where he (a) failed to prevent the commission of those crimes, know or had reason to know that they would likely be committed, or (b) failed to punish those who committed them.") of the ICT statutes for violating international humanitarian laws. The offenses occurred in the Bosniak- and Croat-controlled Čelebići prison camp. Delić was found guilty of using rape as torture, which was a breach of the Fourth Geneva Convention and that he had violated the laws and customs of war. The trial chamber also found that Mucić was guilty of crimes carried out while he was commander of the camp, under the principle of command responsibility, these included gender related atrocities.

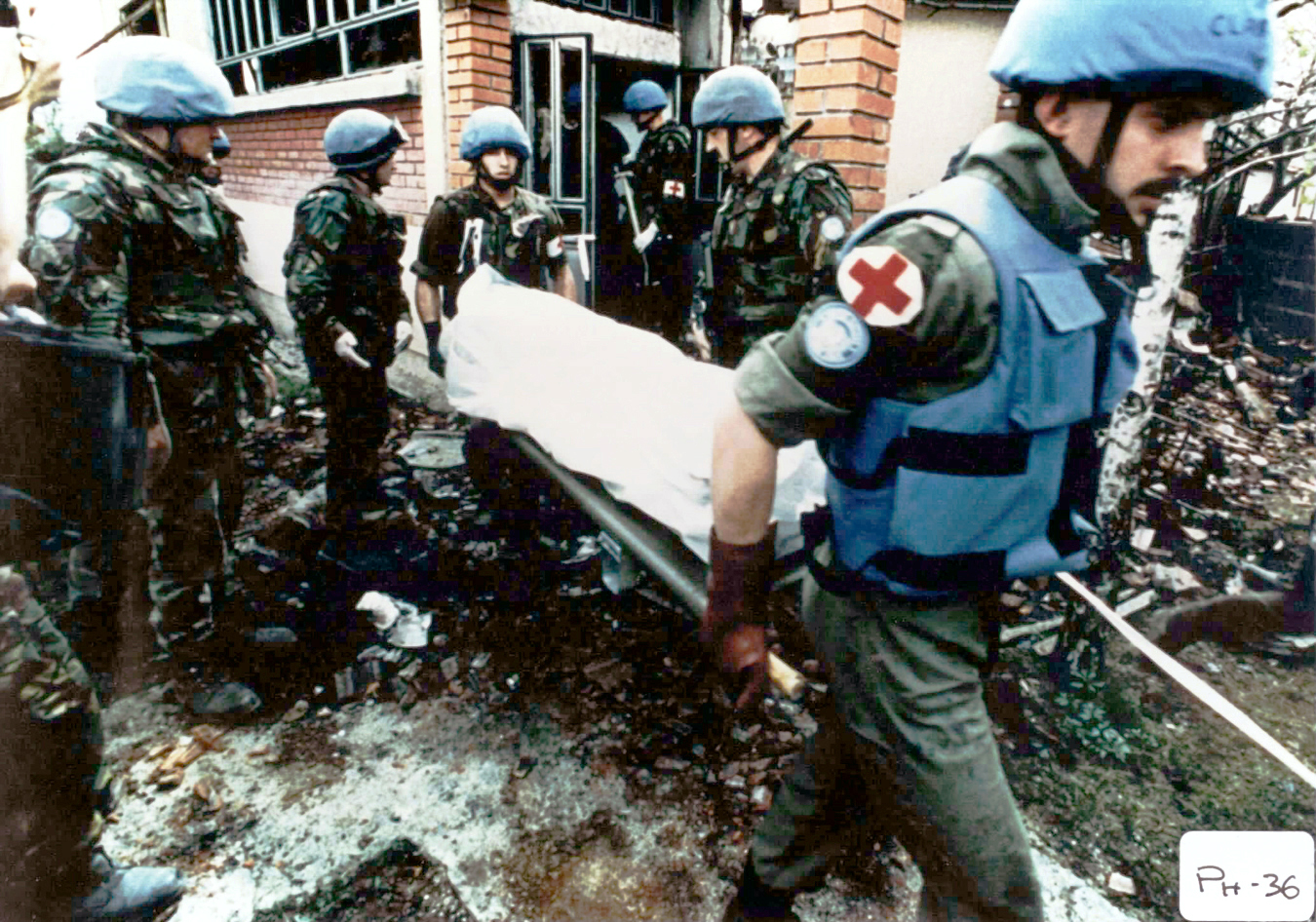
UN Peace keepers collecting bodies following the Ahmići massacre in April 1993. (Photograph provided courtesy of the ICTY)

On 22 June 1998, Anto Furundžija, who had been apprehended on 18 December 1997 by Dutch forces who were operating with NATO, was put on trial in what was one of the shortest trials heard by the ICTY. This was the first case heard by the ICTY which dealt exclusively with charges for rape. Furundžija was a Bosnian Croat and local commander of the militia known as The Jokers, who took part in the Lašva Valley ethnic cleansing and who were under the command of the Croatian Defence Council. Furundžija was indicted for individual criminal responsibility, which included "committing, planning, instigating, ordering or otherwise aiding and abetting in the planning, preparation or execution of any crimes referred to in articles two and three of the tribunal statute." A single witness, who had been assaulted by Furundžija while he interrogated her, gave the majority of testimony during this trial. She was beaten, and another soldier forced her to have oral and vaginal sex while Furundžija was present. Furundžija did not act to prevent the assault, even though he was in a position of command. His defense counsel argued that the witness was suffering from post traumatic stress disorder and had misidentified the accused. The trial chamber gave Furundžija two sentences of 10 and 8 years to run concurrently having found him guilty under article three, in that he had violated "the laws or customs of war for torture and for outrages upon personal dignity, including rape."

In May 2009, Jadranko Prlić, who had been prime minister of the self-proclaimed Bosnian Croat wartime state of Herzeg-Bosnia, was convicted of murder, rape and expulsion of Bosniaks. He was sentenced to 25 years imprisonment.

According to Margot Wallström, U.N. Special Representative on Sexual Violence in Conflict, only 12 cases out of an estimated 50,000 to 60,000 have been prosecuted as of 2010. By April 2011 the ICTY had indicted 93 men, of these 44 were indicted for crimes related to sexual violence.

On 9 March 2005, the War Crimes Chamber of the Court of Bosnia and Herzegovina, was officially inaugurated. At first this was a hybrid court of international and national judges, by 2009 all judicial actions were handed over to the domestic authorities.

Radovan Stanković was a member of an elite paramilitary unit from Vukovar which was commanded by Pero Elez. Following the death of Elez, Stanković took command of Karaman's house, which he ran as a brothel. On 14 November 2006, the domestic court in Sarajevo tried Stanković and he was given a 16-year sentence for forcing women into prostitution. On 26 May 2007, while being transported to hospital Stankovic escaped from custody.

Neđo Samardžić was given a sentence of 13 years and 4 months after he was found guilty of crimes against humanity. He had been indicted on ten counts, four of which he was found guilty of. These included multiple rape, beatings, murder, and forcing women to be sexual slaves. Samardžić was also found guilty of having committed atrocities at Karaman's house. Samardžić appealed and was given 24 years' imprisonment having been found guilty on nine of the ten indictments.

Gojko Janković surrendered himself to the authorities in Bosnia in 2005. He was transferred to The Hague for trial but the ICTY sent him back to Bosnia to be tried before the domestic court. He was indicted for the rights violations of, aiding and abetting and issuing orders during an attack on the non-Serbian population which resulted in the killing, and sexual abuse of, non-Serbians, the majority of whom were Bosniak women and girls. He was given a sentence of 34 years' imprisonment having been found guilty.

Dragan Damjanović (24 years in prison) was convicted of war crimes including murder, torture and rape.

Momir Savić was given 18 years' imprisonment in July 2009 for crimes he had carried out while a commander of the Serbian armies "Višegrad Brigade". He was convicted for the repeated rape of a Bosniak woman, arson, looting and carrying out executions.

On 12 January 2009, Željko Lelek was given 13 years' imprisonment for crimes against humanity, which included rape. Lelek, who was a police officer at the time, was convicted for actions he carried out during the Višegrad massacres.

Miodrag Nikačević, a police officer from Foča, was indicted by the domestic court in 2007 for crimes against humanity carried out in 1992. The indictment against him was for two counts of rape. In April 1992, Nikačević, who was in uniform and armed, forcibly robbed and raped one woman. The second charge was for the abuse of and rape of another woman in July 1992 in Foča. During the trial, the defense produced ten witnesses who claimed that Nikačević had not taken part in any war crimes, and had at times risked his own safety to help others. He was found guilty on 19 February 2009 and sentenced to 8 years' imprisonment for the rapes of both women, and for aiding and abetting in the abduction and illegal detention of a Bosniak civilian, who was later killed at an undisclosed location. Milorad Krnojelac, Janko Janjić, Dragan Gagović and others were indicted in 1992 for human rights violations committed during the ethnic cleansing of Foča. The indictment included a charge of rape.

Ante Kovač, who was a commander of the military police in the Croat Defence Council, was indicted on 25 March 2008 on war crimes carried out against Bosniaks in the municipality of Vitez in 1993. The charges included allegations of rapes carried out at detention camps in the region. Kovač was cleared on one count of rape but found guilty on another. He was sentenced to 9 years' imprisonment.

Veselin Vlahović, also known as "Batko" or the "Monster of Grbavica", was sentenced to 45 years' imprisonment in March 2013, having been found guilty on more than sixty counts, including the murder, rape and torture of Bosniak and Croat civilians during the Siege of Sarajevo. Vlahović's sentence was the longest handed down, slightly longer than that of Sanko Kojić, who—earlier in 2013—had been sentenced to 43 years' imprisonment for his role in the Srebrenica massacre.

== In popular culture ==
Grbavica is a feature film directed by Jasmila Žbanić. It is set in post-war Sarajevo and focuses on Esma, a single mother, and Sara, her daughter, who discovers she is a war baby as her mother had been raped. The film won the 2006 Golden Bear award at the 56th Berlin International Film Festival. Žbanić had also written and directed a short documentary about the war in 2000, titled Red Rubber Boots. In the Land of Blood and Honey, directed by Angelina Jolie, also deals with the subject of wartime rape. The Abandoned is a 2010 Bosnian film directed by Adis Bakrač and written by Zlatko Topčić, which is the story of a boy from an orphanage who tries to find out the truth about his origins, it being implied that he is the child of a rape. The 1998 war film Savior is about an American mercenary escorting a Serb woman to a UN safe area after she has been raped and impregnated by a Bosniak soldier.

Calling the Ghosts is a documentary about a Bosniak woman and a Croat woman, who both survived being raped and tortured at Omarska. The film ends with the two women giving testimony at The Hague. I Came to Testify is a documentary by PBS which covers the story of sixteen women who were imprisoned by Serb forces in Foča, and who later testified against their assailants at the ICTY. Both of the documentaries A Boy from A War Movie (2004) and An Invisible Child's Trap (2015), directed by Šemsudin Gegić, discuss the lives of children conceived as a result of wartime rape.

The play U ime oca (transl. In the Name of the Father) is a joint Austrian-Bosnian production, by the National Theater of Tuzla and The Alpha Group production company. The play is a documentary-dance piece directed by Darrel Toulon. Performers come from Bosnia and Herzegovina and Austria.

Audio documentaries

- BBC - Only One Bakia, a radio documentary about the Association of Women Victims of War

== See also ==
Sexual abuse by UN peacekeepers

== Bibliography ==
- Abu-Hamad, Aziz (1995). "Rape as a Weapon of War". The Human Rights Watch Global Report on Women's Human Rights. Human Rights Watch. ISBN 0-300-06546-9.
- "Bosnia's 'Monster of Grbavica' gets 45 years". Al Jazeera. Agence France-Presse. 29 March 2013.
- Allen, Beverly (1996). Rape Warfare: Hidden Genocide in Bosnia-Herzegovina and Croatia. University of Minnesota Press. ISBN 978-0-8166-2818-6.
- Barberet, Rosemary L. (2014). Women, Crime and Criminal Justice: A Global Enquiry. Routledge. ISBN 978-0-415-85636-2.
- Beames, Robert (15 February 2012). "Berlin Film Festival: Angelina Jolie's In the Land of Blood and Honey, review". The Daily Telegraph.
- "Bosnia jails Serb Veselin Vlahovic for war crimes". BBC. 29 March 2013.
- Becirevic, Edina (2014). Genocide on the Drina River. Yale University Press. ISBN 978-0-300-19258-2.
- Bell, Jared O. (2 April 2018). "4. Sexual Violence: Has a Justification for Thematic Prosecution Been Developed?". The Bosnian War Crimes Justice Strategy a Decade Later (FICHL Policy Brief Series No. 92 ed.). Torkel Opsahl Academic Publisher. p. 3. ISBN 978-82-8348-078-8.
- "Nine Years for Crimes Committed in Vite". Justice Report. BRIN. 12 November 2010. Archived from the original on 9 August 2014.
- "Kovac charged over Vitez Crimes". Justice Report. BRIN. 25 March 2008. Archived from the original on 9 August 2014.
- "Samardzic sentenced to 13 years". Justice Report. BRIN. 7 April 2006. Archived from the original on 9 August 2014.
- "Nikacevic: Indictment confirmed". Justice Report. BRIN. 17 March 2008. Archived from the original on 9 August 2014.
- "Samardzic gets 24-year jail sentence". Justice Report. BIRN BiH. 14 December 2006. Archived from the original on 9 August 2014.
- Bogati, Vjera (28 July 2001). "Courtside: Tuta & Stela - First Mostar Crimes Heard". Institute for War & Peace Reporting. Archived from the original on 28 July 2014.
- Boose, Lynda E. (2002). "Crossing the River Drina: Bosnian Rape Camps, Turkish Impalement, and Serb Cultural Memory". Signs. 28 (1). University of Chicago Press: 71–96. doi:10.1086/340921. JSTOR 10.1086/340921. S2CID 145718891.
- Borchelt, Gretchen (2005). "Sexual Violence Against Women in War and Armed Conflict". In Barnes, Andrea (ed.). The Handbook of Women, Psychology, and the Law (1st ed.). John Wiley & Sons. pp. 293–327. ISBN 978-0-7879-7060-4.
- Boraine, Alex (18 December 2002). "Toward reconciliation : War criminal's remorse could help Bosnia heal". The New York Times.
- Brooks, Roy L. (1999). "The Age of Apology". In Brooks, Roy L. (ed.). When Sorry isn't Enough: The Controversy Over Apologies and Reparations for Human Injustice. New York University Press. pp. 3–12. ISBN 978-0-8147-1332-7.
- Brunner, Lisl (15 December 2006). "Bosnian Serb sentenced to 20 years by war crimes court". JURIST.
- Burg, Steven L.; Shoup, Paul S. (2000). Ethnic Conflict and International Intervention: Crisis in Bosnia-Herzegovina, 1990–93 (New ed.). M.E. Sharpe. ISBN 978-1-56324-309-7.
- Buss, Doris (2002). "Prosecuting Mass Rape: Prosecutor v. Dragoljub Kunarac, Radomir Kovac and Zoran Vukovic". Feminist Legal Studies. 10 (1): 91–99. doi:10.1023/A:1014965414217. S2CID 141287152.
- de Brouwer, Anne-Marie (2005). Supranational Criminal Prosecution of Sexual Violence: The ICC and the Practice of the ICTY and the ICTR. Intersentia. ISBN 978-90-5095-533-1.
- Carpenter, R. Charli (2010). Forgetting Children Born of War: Setting the Human Rights Agenda in Bosnia. Columbia University Press. ISBN 978-0-231-15130-6.
- Cawthorne, Nigel (2009). The World's Ten Most Evil Men - From Twisted Dictators to Child Killers. John Blake. ISBN 978-1-84454-745-6.
- Cengic, Amir (2009). "Cases". In Cassese, Antonio (ed.). The Oxford Companion to International Criminal Justice. Oxford University Press. ISBN 978-0-19-923832-3.
- Cerkez, Aida (26 November 2010). "UN official: Bosnia war rapes must be prosecuted". Fox News.
- Ching, Jacqueline (2008). Genocide and the Bosnian War. Rosen Publishing. ISBN 978-1-4042-1826-0.
- Cohen, Philip J. (1996). "The Complicity of Serbian Intellectuals". In Cushman, Thomas; Mestrovic, Stjepan G. (eds.). This Time We Knew: Western Responses to Genocide in Bosnia. New York University Press. pp. 39–65. ISBN 978-0-8147-1535-2.
- Crowe, David M. (2013). War Crimes, Genocide, and Justice: A Global History. Palgrave Macmillan. ISBN 978-0-230-62224-1.
- Dewey, Susan (2008). Hollow Bodies: Institutional Responses to Sex Trafficking in Armenia, Bosnia and India. Kumarian Press. ISBN 978-1-56549-265-3.
- Damon, Matt (11 October 2011). "I Came to Testify". PBS. Archived from the original on 9 December 2011.
- Doja, Albert (2019). "Politics of mass rapes in ethnic conflict: a morphodynamics of raw madness and cooked evil" (PDF). Crime, Law and Social Change. 71 (5): 541–580. doi:10.1007/s10611-018-9800-0. S2CID 149928004.
- Drakulic, Slavenka (2013). They Would Never Hurt A Fly (1st American ed.). Viking Press. ISBN 978-0-670-03332-4.
- Dombrowski, Nicole A. (2004). Women and War in the Twentieth Century: Enlisted With Or Without Consent. Routledge. p. 333. ISBN 978-0-415-97256-7. "The apparent uniqueness of the rape directed overwhelmingly against Bosnian–Muslim women as part of a genocidal campaign of "ethnic cleansing""
- Downey, Anthony (2013). "Exemplary Subjects: Camps and the Politics of Representation". In Frost, Tom (ed.). Giorgio Agamben: Legal, Political and Philosophical Perspectives. Routledge. p. 142. ISBN 978-0-415-63758-9.
- Dutton, Donald G. (2007). The Psychology of Genocide, Massacres, and Extreme Violence: Why "Normal" People Come to Commit Atrocities (1st ed.). Praeger. ISBN 978-0-275-99000-8.
- Džidić, Denic; Dzidic, Denis (29 September 2015). "'20,000 Women Sexually Assaulted' During Bosnian War". Balkan Insight.
- Eboe-Osuji, Chile (2007). "Superior or Command Responsibility: A Doubtful Theory of Criminal Responsibility at the Ad Hoc Tribunals". In Decaux, Emmanuel; Dieng, Adama; Sow, Malick (eds.). Des droits de l'homme au droit international pénal (Bilingual ed.). Martinus Nijhoff. pp. 311–344. ISBN 978-90-04-16055-2.
- Elsie, Robert (2004). Historical Dictionary of Kosova. Scarecrow Press. ISBN 978-0-8108-5309-6.
- Escritt, Thomas; Zuvela, Maja (29 May 2013). "Bosnian Croat leaders jailed for 1990s ethnic cleansing". Reuters.
- Ferguson, Niall (1996). The War of The World: Twentieth-Century Conflict and the Descent of the West (Reprint ed.). Penguin Books. ISBN 978-0-14-311239-6.
- Ferguson, Niall (2009). The War of the World: History's Age of Hatred. Penguin Books. ISBN 978-0-14-101382-4.
- Gadzo, Mersiha (29 December 2017). "Court fees and fear: Bosnia war rape victims struggle". Al Jazeera.
- Ginn, Courtney (2013). "Ensuring The Effective Prosecution Of Sexually Violent Crimes In The Bosnian War Crimes Chamber: Applying Lessons From The ICTY". Emory International Law Review. 27: 566–601.
- Goodman, Walter (3 March 1997). "Women as Victims of the Bosnian War". The New York Times.
- Goscilo, Helena (2012). Hashamova, Yana (ed.). Embracing Arms - Cultural Representation of Slavic and Balkan Women in War. Central European University Press. ISBN 978-615-5225-09-3.
- Haas, Michael (2013). International Human Rights: A Comprehensive Introduction (2nd ed.). Routledge. ISBN 978-0-415-53820-6.
- Halilovich, Hariz (2013). Places of Pain: Forced Displacement, Popular Memory, and Trans-Local Identities in Bosnian War-Torn Communities. Berghahn Books. ISBN 978-0857457769.
- Hazan, Pierre (2004). Justice in a Time of War: The True Story Behind the International Criminal Tribunal for the Former Yugoslavia. Texas A&M University Press. ISBN 978-1-58544-411-3.
- Henry, Nicola (2010). War and Rape: Law, Memory, and Justice. Routledge. ISBN 978-0-415-56472-4.
- Hewstone, Miles (2009). "Why Neighbors Kill: Prior Intergroup Contact and Ethnic Outgroup Neighbors". In Esses, Victoria M.; Vernon, Richard A. (eds.). Explaining the Breakdown of Ethnic Relations. Wiley-Blackwell. pp. 61–92. ISBN 978-1-4443-0306-3.
- Husejnović, Merima (26 January 2009). "Analysis – Nikacevic: Ten Witnesses Deny Rape Allegations". BIRN. Justice Report. Archived from the original on 9 August 2014.
- Hyndman, Jennifer (2009). "Genocide and Ethnic Cleansing". In Essed, Philomena; Goldberg, David Theo; Kobayashi, Audrey (eds.). A Companion to Gender Studies (New ed.). Wiley-Blackwell. pp. 202–211. ISBN 978-1-4051-8808-1.
- Ivanišević, Bogdan (2008). The War Crimes Chamber in Bosnia and Herzegovina: From Hybrid to Domestic Court. International Center for Transitional Justice.
- Johan Vetlesen, Arne (2005). Evil and Human Agency: Understanding Collective Evildoing. Cambridge University Press. ISBN 978-0-521-67357-0.
- Kennedy, Michael D. (2002). Cultural Formations of Postcommunism: Emancipation, Transition, Nation and War. University of Minnesota Press. ISBN 978-0-8166-3857-4.
- Kosmidou, Eleftheria Rania (2012). European Civil War Films: Memory, Conflict, and Nostalgia. Routledge. ISBN 978-0-415-52320-2.
- Leaning, Jennifer; Bartels, Susan; Mowafi, Hani (2009). "Sexual Violence during War and Forced Migration". In Susan Forbes Martin, John Tirman (ed.). Women, Migration, and Conflict: Breaking a Deadly Cycle. Springer. pp. 173–199. ISBN 978-9048128242.
- LeBor, Adam (2006). "Recently Disturbed Earth". "Complicity with Evil" The United Nations in the Age of Modern Genocide. Yale University Press. ISBN 978-0-300-13514-5. JSTOR j.ctt1npvrk.
- Lee, John Y. (2000). "Japanese War Criminals on the U.S. Justice Departments "Watchlist" of 3 December 1996: The Legal and Political Background". In Stetz, Margaret D.; Oh, Bonnie B. C. (eds.). Legacies of the Comfort Women of World War II. M.E. Sharpe. pp. 152–170. ISBN 978-0-7656-0544-3.
- Lekha Sriram, Chandra; Martin-Ortega, Olga; Herman, Johanna (2014). War, Conflict and Human Rights: Theory and practice (2nd ed.). Routledge. ISBN 978-0-415-83226-7.
- Lieberman, Benjamin (2013). The Holocaust and Genocides in Europe (1st ed.). Bloomsbury Academic. ISBN 978-1-4411-9478-7.
- Lončar, Mladen; Medved, Vesna (2006). "Psychological Consequences of Rape on Women in 1991–1995 War in Croatia and Bosnia and Herzegovina". Croatian Medical Journal. 47 (1): 67–75. PMC 2080379. PMID 16489699.
- Luban, David (2009). International and transnational criminal law. Aspen. ISBN 978-0-7355-6214-1.
- Malek, Cate (2005). "Reconciliation in Bosnia". Beyond Intractability. University of Colorado.
- Maners, Lynn D. (2000). "Clapping for Serbs: Nationalism and Performance in Bosnia and Herzegovina". In Halpern, Joel M.; Kideckel, David A. (eds.). Neighbors at War: Anthropological Perspectives on Yugoslav Ethnicity, Culture and History. Pennsylvania State University Press. pp. 302–315. ISBN 978-0-271-01979-6.
- May, Larry (2007). War Crimes and Just War (1st ed.). Cambridge University Press. ISBN 978-0-521-69153-6.
- McDonald, Gabrielle Kirk; Swaak-Goldman, Olivia (1999). Substantive and Procedural Aspects of International Criminal Law: The Experience of International and National Courts, Documents: 002. Kluwer Law. ISBN 978-90-411-1134-0.
- Meron, Theodor (2011). The Making of International Criminal Justice: A View from the Bench: Selected Speeches. Oxford University Press. ISBN 978-0-19-960893-5.
- Mojzes, Paul (2011). Balkan Genocides: Holocaust and Ethnic Cleansing in the Twentieth Century. Rowman & Littlefield Publishers. ISBN 978-1-4422-0663-2.
- Morales, Waltraud Queiser (2001). "Feminization of Global Scarcity and Violence". In Dobkowski, Michael N.; Wallimann, Isidor (eds.). On the Edge of Scarcity: Environment, Resources, Population, Sustainability and Conflict (2nd ed.). Syracuse University Press. pp. 173–182. ISBN 978-0-8156-2943-6.
- Nikolic-Ristanovic, Vesna (2000). Women, Violence and War: Wartime Victimization of Refugees in the Balkans. Central European University Press. ISBN 978-9-6391-1660-3.
- Oosthuizen, Gabriël H. (2010). Review of the Sexual Violence Elements of the Judgements of the International Criminal Tribunal for the Former Yugoslavia, the International Criminal ... the Light of Security Council Resolution 18. United Nations. ISBN 978-92-1-137032-4.
- Parrot, Andrea; Cummings, Nina (2008). Sexual Enslavement of Girls and Women Worldwide. Greenwood Publishing Group. ISBN 978-0-275-99291-0.
- Pelinka, Anton; Ronen, Dov (1997). The Challenge of Ethnic Conflict, Democracy and Self-determination in Central Europe. Routledge. ISBN 978-0-7146-4752-4.
- Pulver, Andrew (10 February 2012). "In the Land of Blood and Honey – review". The Guardian.
- Von Ragenfeld-Feldman, Norma (1997). "The Victimization of Women: Rape and the Reporting of Rape in Bosnia-Herzegovina, 1992–1993". Fifth Annual Interdisciplinary German Studies Conference.
- Ralston, John H.; Finnin, Sarah (2007). "International Law Enforcement Strategies". In Blumenthal, David A.; McCormack, Timothy L. H. (eds.). The Legacy of Nuremberg: Civilising Influence Or Institutionalised Vengeance?. Brill. pp. 47–68. ISBN 978-90-04-15691-3.
- "'Invisible' Bosnians born of wartime rape use art to find their voice". Reuters. Reuters. 15 October 2019.
- "Bosnia court jails ex-Serb army commander for 18 years". Reuters. Reuters. 3 July 2009.
- Robinson, Darryl (1998). "Trials, Tribulations, and Triumphs: Major Developments in 1997 at the International Criminal Tribunal for the Former Yugoslavia". In McRae, Donald M. (ed.). The Canadian Yearbook of International Law (Volume 35 ed.). University of British Columbia Press. pp. 179–213. ISBN 978-0-7748-0679-4.
- Sander, Helke (1994). "Prologue". In Stiglmayer, Alexandra (ed.). Mass Rape: The War against Women in Bosnia-Herzegovina. Bison Books. pp. xvii–xxiii. ISBN 978-0-8032-4239-5.
- Senasi, Deneen (2008). "Signs of Desire: Nationalism, War, and Rape in Titus Andronicus, Savior, and Calling the Ghosts". In Forter, Greg; Miller, Paul Allen (eds.). Desire of the Analysts: Psychoanalysis and Cultural Criticism. State University of New York Press. pp. 99–122. ISBN 978-0-7914-7300-9.
- Smith-Spark, Laura (8 December 2004). "How did rape become a weapon of war?". British Broadcasting Corporation.
- Stiglmayer, Alexandra (1994). "The Rapes in Bosnia-Herzegovina". In Stiglmayer, Alexandra (ed.). Mass Rape: The War Against Women in Bosnia-Herzegovina. University of Nebraska Press. pp. 82–169. ISBN 978-0-8032-9229-1.
- Skjelsbæk, Inger (2006). "Victim and Survivor: Narrated Social Identities of Women Who Experienced Rape During the War in Bosnia-Herzegovina". Feminism & Psychology. 16 (4). Sage: 373–403. doi:10.1177/0959353506068746. S2CID 145206051.
- "Seventh Report on War Crimes in the Former Yugoslavia: Part II". US submission of information to the United Nations Security Council. 1993.
- Simic, Olivera (2014). Regulation of Sexual Conduct in UN Peacekeeping Operations. Springer. ISBN 978-3-642-42785-5.
- "Bosnian Serb gets 18 years in killings". Los Angeles Times. 4 July 2009.
- Sjoberg, Laura; Gentry, Caron E. (2007). Mothers, Monsters, Whores: Women's Violence in Global Politics. Zed Books. ISBN 978-1-84277-866-1.
- Saunders, Doug (5 April 2009). "Children born of rape come of age in Bosnia". Globe and Mail.
- Van Sliedregt, Elies (2012). Individual Criminal Responsibility in International Law. Oxford University Press. ISBN 978-0-19-956036-3.
- Tausan, Marija (20 August 2013). "Defence Witnesses Speak about Abusers in Uzamnica". BRIN. Archived from the original on 16 October 2021.
- Totten, Samuel; Bartrop, Paul R. (2007). Dictionary of Genocide. ABC-CLIO. ISBN 978-0-313-32967-8.
- Turto, Sue (21 July 2017). "Bosnian War rape survivors speak of their suffering 25 years on". The Independent.
- Weitsman, Patricia A. (2008). "The Politics of Identity and Sexual Violence: A Review of Bosnia and Rwanda". Human Rights Quarterly. 30 (3): 561–578. doi:10.1353/hrq.0.0024. S2CID 143000182.
- Waller, James E. (2002). Becoming Evil: How Ordinary People Commit Genocide and Mass Killing. Oxford University Press. ISBN 978-0-19-514868-8.
- Walsh, Annelotte (2012). "International Criminal Justice and the Girl Child". In Yarwood, Lisa (ed.). Women and Transitional Justice: The Experience of Women as Participants. Lisa Yarwood. pp. 54–74. ISBN 978-0-415-69911-2.
- Weitsman, Patricia (2007). "Children Born of War and the Politics of Identity". In Carpenter, Charli (ed.). Born of War: Protecting Children of Sexual Violence Survivors in Conflict Zones. Kumarian Press. pp. 110–127. ISBN 978-1-56549-237-0.
- Williams, Paul R.; Scharf, Michael P. (1998). "Task Force Statement of the Twentieth Century Fund's Task Force on Apprehending Indicted War Criminals: Meeting the Obligations of Justice". Human Rights. 3 (25). American Bar Association: 17–20. JSTOR 27880109.
- Wood, Elisabeth J. (2013). Miranda A.H Horvath, Jessica Woodhams (ed.). Handbook on the Study of Multiple Perpetrator Rape: A multidisciplinary response to an international problem. Routledge. ISBN 978-0-415-50044-9.
- Yee, Sienho (2003). "The Doctrine of Command Responsibility". International Crime and Punishment: Selected Issues (Volume 1 ed.). University Press of America. ISBN 978-0-7618-2570-8.
- Zappala, Salvatore (2009). "Cases". In Cassese, Antonio (ed.). The Oxford Companion to International Criminal Justice. Oxford University Press. pp. 683–685. ISBN 978-0-19-923832-3.
- Zuvela, Maja (19 February 2009). "Bosnian Serb jailed for 8 years for wartime rapes". Reuters.
