= Čelebići camp =

Prison camp in Bosnia during the Bosnian War

- Internment camp
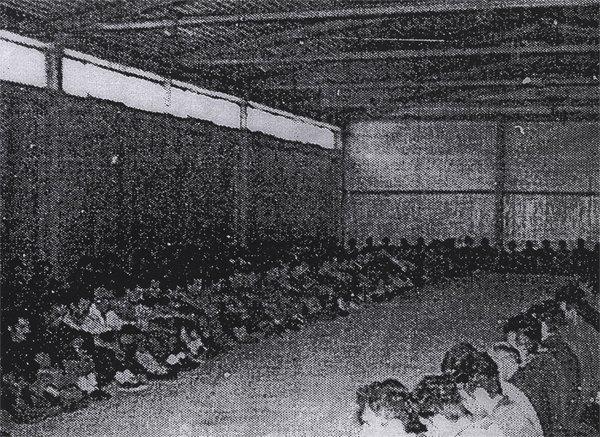
- Serbs from the Konjic area detained in the Čelebići camp

- Location within Bosnia and Herzegovina
- Coordinates: 43°41′1″N 17°53′45″E
- Location: Čelebići, Konjic municipality, Bosnia and Herzegovina
- Operated by: Bosnian Ministry of the Interior, Croatian Defence Council, Bosnian Territorial Defence
- Operational: April–December 1992
- Inmates: Bosnian Serbs
- Number of inmates: 400–700
- Killed: 14–30

The Čelebići camp was a prison camp run by joint Bosniak and Bosnian Croat forces during the Bosnian War where Serb prisoners were detained and subjected to murder, beatings, torture, sexual assaults and otherwise cruel and inhumane treatment. The facility was used by several units of the Bosnian Ministry of the Interior (MUP), Croatian Defence Council (HVO) and later the Bosnian Territorial Defence Forces (TO). It was located in Čelebići, a village in the central Bosnian municipality of Konjic.

The camp was operational from April to December 1992 and approximately 400-700 Serbs were held there during its existence. Most of the Serb detainees were civilians, arrested during military operations that were intended to unblock routes to Sarajevo and Mostar in May 1992 that had earlier been blocked by Serb forces. Some prisoners were shot or stabbed and killed or beaten to death. It is believed that as many as 30 prisoners died while in captivity.

On 21 March 1996, camp deputy commander Hazim Delić, guard Esad Landžo, commander Zdravko Mucić and Zejnil Delalić were indicted by the ICTY for their roles in the crimes committed at the camp. Following the trial, Delić, Landžo and Mucić were found guilty of violations of the customs of war and grave breaches of the Geneva Conventions for the murder, torture and cruel treatment of prisoners with each receiving a sentence of 20 years, 15 years and 7 years respectively. Delalić was acquitted.

== Background ==
As war broke out in Bosnia, the municipality of Konjic was of historical and strategic importance. It is located in the center of areas both Serbs and Croats long considered to fall within their sphere of influence, with the Croats laying claim to the entire area of Herzegovina and the Serbs primarily interested in the eastern Neretva valley. A key railway line and highway passed through Konjic towards Sarajevo. Several important military facilities were also located in Konjic, including an arms and ammunition factory, JNA barracks and reserve command site, a communications and telecommunications centre, and the Čelebići barracks and warehouses.

In March 1992, Serb political members of the Konjic municipality adopted a decision on the Serbian territories, even though Serbs did not constitute the majority of the population of Konjic nor did it form part of the declared "Serb autonomous regions" set out on 21 November 1991. This was reportedly recognized by the Serbian Democratic Party (SDS) on the basis of the number of Serb representatives in the Municipal Assembly. The SDS, in co-operation with the JNA, had also been active in arming the Serb population of the municipality and in training paramilitary units and militias.

Konjic was also claimed by the Croatian Democratic Union (HDZ) as part of the "Croatian Republic of Herzeg-Bosnia", despite the fact that the Croats did not constitute a majority of the population there either. Therefore, HVO units were established and armed in the municipality by April 1992.

Following the recognition of Bosnia as an independent state, the Municipal Assembly in Konjic met for the final time on 17 April 1992. Decisions for the defence of the municipality were undertaken and the Territorial Defence Force (TO) was mobilized. SDS representatives walked out and the assembly ceased to function.

Between 20 April and early May 1992 Bosnian government forces seized control over most of the strategic assets of the Municipality and some armaments. However, Serb forces controlled the main access points to the municipality, effectively cutting it off from Sarajevo and Mostar. In April, the local authorities in Konjic had already organised their forces pursuant to existing defence regulations. Muslim and Croat forces began to arrive in the city of Konjic from surrounding villages, while Serb inhabitants moved to Serb-controlled villages.

On 4 May 1992, the first shells landed in Konjic, thought to be fired by the JNA and other Serb forces from the slopes of Borašnica and Kisera, nearby mountains. This shelling, inflicted substantial damage and resulted in the loss of many lives and continued until the signing of the Dayton accords.

The de-blocking of the routes to Sarajevo and Mostar became a clear priority for Konjic authorities. This required that the Serbian forces holding the nearby villages of Bradina and Donje Selo, as well as those at Borci and other strategic points, be disarmed.

Authorities attempted to negotiate with the principal representative of the Serbian people, the SDS but these apparent negotiations failed. Thereafter, the Konjic defence forces which included the local Croatian Army (HVO) and the Ministry of the Interior (MUP) in addition to the TO, launched a military campaign: the Bradina operation. At the time, the TO and the HVO had a common interest in uniting against the Serbs and thus co-operated.

== Joint Bosniak and Croat military operations ==
The first area to be targeted was the village of Donje Selo where on 20 May 1992 TO and HVO and forces entered. Muslim and Croat soldiers then moved through Vinište towards the villages of Cerići and Bjelovčina. Cerići, was the first village to be shelled and it was attacked around 22 May and some of its inhabitants surrendered. The village of Bjelovcina was also attacked around that time. Some people in the village of Vinište were arrested around 23 May.

The Serb-populated village of Bradina was shelled in the late afternoon and evening of 25 May and then soldiers in both camouflage and black uniforms appeared, firing their weapons and setting fire to buildings. At least 43 or 48 Serb civilians were killed in the Bradina massacre and the village was burned to the ground. Many of the population sought to flee and some withdrew to the centre of the village. They were nonetheless, arrested at various times around 27 and 28 May, by TO, HVO and MUP soldiers and police. These operations resulted in the arrest of many members of the Serb population, necessitating a facility where they could be detained.

== The camp ==
=== Establishment ===
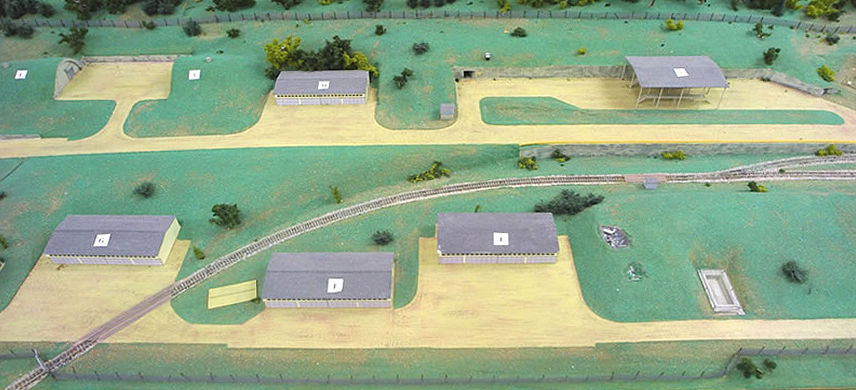
Model of the Čelebići camp, near Konjic, Bosnia and Herzegovina. Presented as evidence in the Mucić et al. trial. (Photograph provided courtesy of the ICTY)

The former JNA Čelebići compound appears to have been chosen out of necessity as the appropriate facilities for the detention of prisoners in Konjic were minimal. The compound was a relatively large complex of buildings covering an area of about 50,000 square metres, with a railway line running through the middle. The JNA had used it for fuel storage and so it had underground tunnels and tanks, in addition to various hangars and assorted buildings. Only a small part of the camp was actually used to detain prisoners. At the entrance laid a small reception building beside a larger administrative building, referred to by the ICTY as "Building A" and "Building B" respectively. A building containing water pumps referred to "Building 22" was located opposite. To the north-east was a tunnel that was 1.5 metres wide and 2.5 metres high, labeled "Tunnel 9" by the ICTY. It extended about 30 metres downwards into the ground and led, after a steel door, to a fuel measuring and distribution station. On the other side of the camp, beside other buildings was a large metal one, 30 metres long and 13 metres wide, referred to as "Hangar 6".

The camp was operational from April 1992 to December 1992.

The total number of prisoners held at the camp is not known but estimates range from at least 400 to as many as 700.

=== Inmates ===
The majority of the prisoners who were detained were men captured during and after the military operations at Bradina and Donje Selo and their surrounding areas. Many of the men who were rounded up were elderly or infirm. The women who were held at the camp were housed separately, first at Building A then Building B. Most of the prisoners were civilians.

Most of the detainees were captured between 22 and 27 May 1992 and transferred to the camp from various locations and villages. A large group of people from Bradina were arrested on 27 May, made to walk in a column then searched and beaten by their captors before being loaded into trucks and transported to the camp. These Bradina detainees, numbering 70-80 were taken to Hangar 6 and appear to have been the first group stationed there. Many of the witnesses who were taken to the camp testified that upon their arrival, they were made to line up against a wall where they were searched or forced to hand over valuables. Several said that they were severely beaten by soldiers or guards. Other detainees were housed in Building 22 which was tightly packed with people and later moved to Hangar 6. Some spent a substantial amount of time in the tunnel.

A Military Investigating Commission was formed with its purpose being to establish the responsibility of these persons for any military involvement or crimes. However, it was made evident during the trial that the commission had been created as a façade to give the Čelebići camp some semblance of legality. It only lasted for a month. Members of the commission were so horrified by the conditions the detainees were living in, the injuries they suffered, and the state of terror prevailing in the camp, that they resigned en masse. Nevertheless, the commission interviewed many of the Čelebići inmates and took their statements, as well as analyzing other documents which had been collected to determine if they had a role in the combat against the Konjic authorities. As a result, prisoners were placed in various categories and the commission compiled a report recommending that certain persons be released. Some of the individuals who had been placed in the lower categories were subsequently transferred to the Musala sports hall. Others were exchanged, some under the auspices of the International Red Cross who visited the camp in August.

=== Conditions and treatment ===
From the camp's establishment to its closure, detainees were subjected to murder, beatings, torture, sexual assaults and otherwise cruel and inhumane treatment.

Tunnel 9 was utilised for the incarceration of many detainees, containing at least 80 individuals at one point and, given its small size, was extremely crowded. Prisoners rarely bathed, slept on concrete floors without blankets, and many were forced to defecate on the floor. A former prisoner at the camp, described his and others' ordeal inside the tunnel to the Belgrade-based independent news agency Vreme News Digest:

They beat us every evening. The guards beat us along with anyone else they brought back from the bar. They took anyone they knew out of the tunnel because there wasn't enough space there. All the walls were bloody. They grabbed us by the hair and beat our heads against the wall. We were afraid to look at them. They made us drink piss and told us we were drinking juice. They issued 700 grams of bread for every 15 men. We ate three slices a day. They didn't let us wash and sometimes they wouldn't give us water to drink... They made us face the wall, raise our arms and they beat us with bats. Sometimes in the tunnel, sometimes outside. The guards beat us as well as territorial defence troops coming back from the front. Whoever wanted to beat us. There wasn't one moment without screams and the sound of beating.

A large number of prisoners were confined to Hangar 6, at least 240 at one point. They had assigned places on the floor where they had to remain seated, arranged in rows. Given that the building was made out of metal, it became hot during the daytime and prisoners were not allowed to leave their places, except in small groups upon request to use the toilet facilities which consisted of an outside ditch.

Soldiers and guards beat prisoners with clubs, rifle butts, wooden planks, shovels and pieces of cable. Prisoners were called out of the hangar daily for beatings. Some of the prisoners testified to having their body parts doused in gasoline before being set alight as a form of torture. Pliers, acid, electric shocks and hot pincers were also used to torture prisoners.

Investigators say that between May and August, about 30 prisoners died from the severity of the "bestial" beatings and a few others were killed, either by being shot or stabbed to death. Several of these victims were elderly. Meanwhile, the few women in the camp, who were kept separate from the men, were frequently raped.

== ICTY trial ==
=== Indictment ===
On 21 March 1996, The ICTY indicted Hazim Delić, Esad Landžo, Zdravko Mucić and Zejnil Delalić for their roles in the crimes committed against Serbs at the camp. Delić was the deputy commander of the Čelebići camp from May 1992 to November 1992. Afterwards, he was the commander until its closure in December 1992, following the departure of Zdravko Mucić. Landžo, also known as "Zenga", was a guard at the camp from May 1992 to December 1992. Mucić was the camp's commander from May 1992 to December 1992. Delalić coordinated the Bosnian Muslim and Bosnian Croat forces in the Konjic area from approximately April 1992 to September 1992 and then commanded the First Tactical Group of the Bosnian Army until November 1992. This was the ICTY's first indictment for perpetrators of crimes against Bosnian Serbs during the war.

Delić, Mucić and Delalić were accused of failing to take the necessary and reasonable measures to prevent or to punish those who mistreated the detainees from their superior positions of authority. The ICTY noted the murders of at least 14 detainees and seven specific acts of torture. Additionally, in the case of Delić, he was also charged with direct involvement in four murders, five specific acts of torture, including two rapes and one case of causing great suffering or serious injury. Landžo was charged with individual responsibility for his direct participation in five murders, four specific acts of torture and one case of causing great suffering and serious injury. All four were charged with grave breaches of the Geneva Conventions and Violations of the Laws and Customs of War.

=== Proceedings ===
Delić and Mucić made their initial court appearances on 11 April 1996, Delalić on 9 May 1996 and Landžo on 18 June 1996. All pleaded not guilty. American journalist Elizabeth Neuffer who covered the trial, described the accused's disdain for the court and lack of seriousness. She noted that "Delic, Landzo, Mucic and Delalic... giggled, scowled and slouched their way through the trial like boys in a junior high detention hall" and how Delić "threatened a defense attorney and made loud disparaging remarks about witnesses while they testified". During testimonies, Delić was observed looking disinterested and chewing gum.

For his part, Landžo claimed he committed the crimes because he wanted to be a "perfect soldier" and unquestioningly obey orders coming from the camp superiors (Delić and Mucić). Just prior to the conclusion of the trial, he confessed to the murder of two of the ones he was charged with as well as some of the torture charges but added that he "does not remember" the rest of the crimes. He admitted among other things, to burning detainees on their arms or legs and forcing two brothers to perform fellatio on each other before tying slow-burning fuses to their genitals and liting them on fire. His confessions shocked the lawyers of the other three co-accused. During the trial, five psychiatrists testified about Landžo's mental state when he committed the crimes. With the exception of the prosecutor's expert, all testified that Landžo had some mental disorder but they each differed on specific diagnoses—from schizophrenic to unstable and deprived. His defense team used this to argue a "diminished or lack of mental responsibility" plea.

=== Judgement and sentencing ===
On 16 November 1998, the ICTY delivered its verdict on the Čelebići case, finding Delić, Landžo and Mucić guilty, but acquitting Delalić of all charges. All three were found guilty of:

- Violations of the laws and customs of war (Art. 3 ICTY Statute): murder, cruel treatment, torture and pillage;
- Serious breaches of the 1949 Geneva Conventions (Art. 2 ICTY Statute): wilful murder, torture, wilfully causing intense suffering or of inflicting serious bodily injury, and inhumane treatment

Delić was found guilty to a part of the charges and sentenced to 20 years in prison on the basis of individual responsibility and hierarchical superiority.

It was found that he beat one detainee over the course of several days which resulted in his death. He beat a detainee with a number of objects, including shovels and electric wires. He placed severe restrictions on the amount of water which could be drunk by detainees, despite there being no shortage of water available. He also violently raped two women in the camp.

Landžo was found guilty on 17 counts and sentenced to 15 years in prison on the basis of his individual responsibility.

It was found that he beat an elderly man and nailed a Serbian Democratic Party badge to his forehead causing him to die from the injuries. He closed a pair of heated pincers against a detainee's tongue, burning his lips, mouth and tongue and then used the pincers to burn the detainee's ears. He cut off a prisoner's air supply using a gas mask and burned his hands, legs and thighs with a heated knife. He also forced a prisoner to do push-ups while kicking him and beating him with a baseball bat.

Mucić was found guilty on 11 counts and sentenced to 7 years in prison on the basis of his individual responsibility and as hierarchical superior.

It was found that he participated in the maintenance of inhumane conditions for the detainees. As commander of the camp, he was responsible for creating the atmosphere of terror that prevailed, whereby detainees lived in a constant state of anguish and fear of being subjected to physical abuse. Under his command, eight detainees were beaten to death.

In the case of Zejnil Delalić, it was found that he did not have enough command and control over the prison camp and the guards who worked there to entail criminal responsibility for their actions.

The trial was the first one for collective violations of international law since World War II. The ICTY found that a superior could be held criminally responsible for failing to prevent crimes by subordinates whether this position was held legally or in practice, and whether the superior was a civilian or a military commander.

The judgment created a precedent by defining "inhuman conditions" in the prison camp, upholding a clause in the 1949 Geneva Convention, which prohibits "violence to life and person, in particular murder of all kinds, mutilation, cruel treatment and torture." In reaching its decision, the ICTY also made a landmark judgement by qualifying rape as a form of torture, the first such judgement by an international criminal tribunal.

=== Appeals and release ===
On 20 February 2001, Appeal judges quashed charges related to the violations of the laws and customs of war for the three convicts, ruling that a single offence could not be judged on two separate articles. Their original sentencing was also sent for review. On 9 October 2001, Delić's sentence was reduced to 18 years while Landžo's original sentence was upheld and Mucić's was extended from 7 to 9 years. Their sentences were upheld on 8 April 2003 after appeals. Mucić was granted early release on 18 July 2003. On 10 July 2003, Delić and Landžo were transferred to Finland to serve out the remainder of their sentences. On 13 April 2006, Landžo was granted early release. Delić was granted early release on 24 June 2008. Both were given credit for time served since 2 May 1996.

== Post-ICTY developments ==
In 2012, the Court of Bosnia and Herzegovina sentenced Eso Macic, a former guard at the camp, to 15 years in prison for the beating and killing of prisoners. A second instance verdict reduced his sentence to 13 years in 2013 and following an appeal, his sentence was further reduced to 11 years in 2015.

In 2019, fourteen former members of the TO, Akrepi Commando and Reconnaissance Squad, HVO and the Konjic police force went on trial at the Bosnian State Court, charged with the murders, detentions, rape, torture and mistreatment of the Serb population in Konjic, as well as burning their property and the local Orthodox church. They also served as guards at the Čelebići camp.

In 2024, a court in the United States convicted former camp guard Kemal Mrndzic of fraud in covering up his role in war crimes in the camp in order to obtain refugee status and subsequent US citizenship.

== See also ==
- Silos camp
- Gabela camp
- Heliodrom camp
- Keraterm camp
- Manjača camp
- Musala camp
- Omarska camp
- Trnopolje camp
- Uzamnica camp
- Vilina Vlas
- Vojno camp
