= Duško Sikirica =

Bosnian Serb (born 1964)

Duško Sikirica (born 23 March 1964, Čirkin Polje, Prijedor, Bosnia and Herzegovina, Yugoslavia) is a Bosnian Serb who was charged with genocide, crimes against humanity, and violations of the customs of war by the International Criminal Tribunal for the Former Yugoslavia (ICTY) for his actions as the commander of the Keraterm camp.

He was transferred to the ICTY on 25 June 2000. He was tried along with Damir Došen and Dragan Kolundžija. Sikirica originally pleaded not guilty to all charges. Later, as part of a plea deal, he pleaded guilty to one charge of persecutions as a crime against humanity. He was sentenced to fifteen years in jail on 13 November 2001. From 2002 on he served his jail time in Austria. On 21 June 2010 he was released.

== See also ==
- Bosnian War
- International Criminal Tribunal for the Former Yugoslavia
