= Dretelj camp =

Prison camp during the Bosnian War

- Prison camp
- Location within Bosnia and Herzegovina
- Coordinates: 43°7′35″N 17°42′24″E
- Location: near Čapljina, Bosnia and Herzegovina
- Operated by: Bosnian Croat military and police authorities (Croatian Defence Forces and the Croatian Defence Council)
- Operational: 1992–1994
- Inmates: Bosniaks and Bosnian Serbs
- Number of inmates: 1,000–2,800

The Dretelj concentration camp or Dretelj prison was a prison camp run by the Croatian Defence Forces (HOS) and later by the Croatian Defence Council (HVO) during the Bosnian War.

== The camp ==
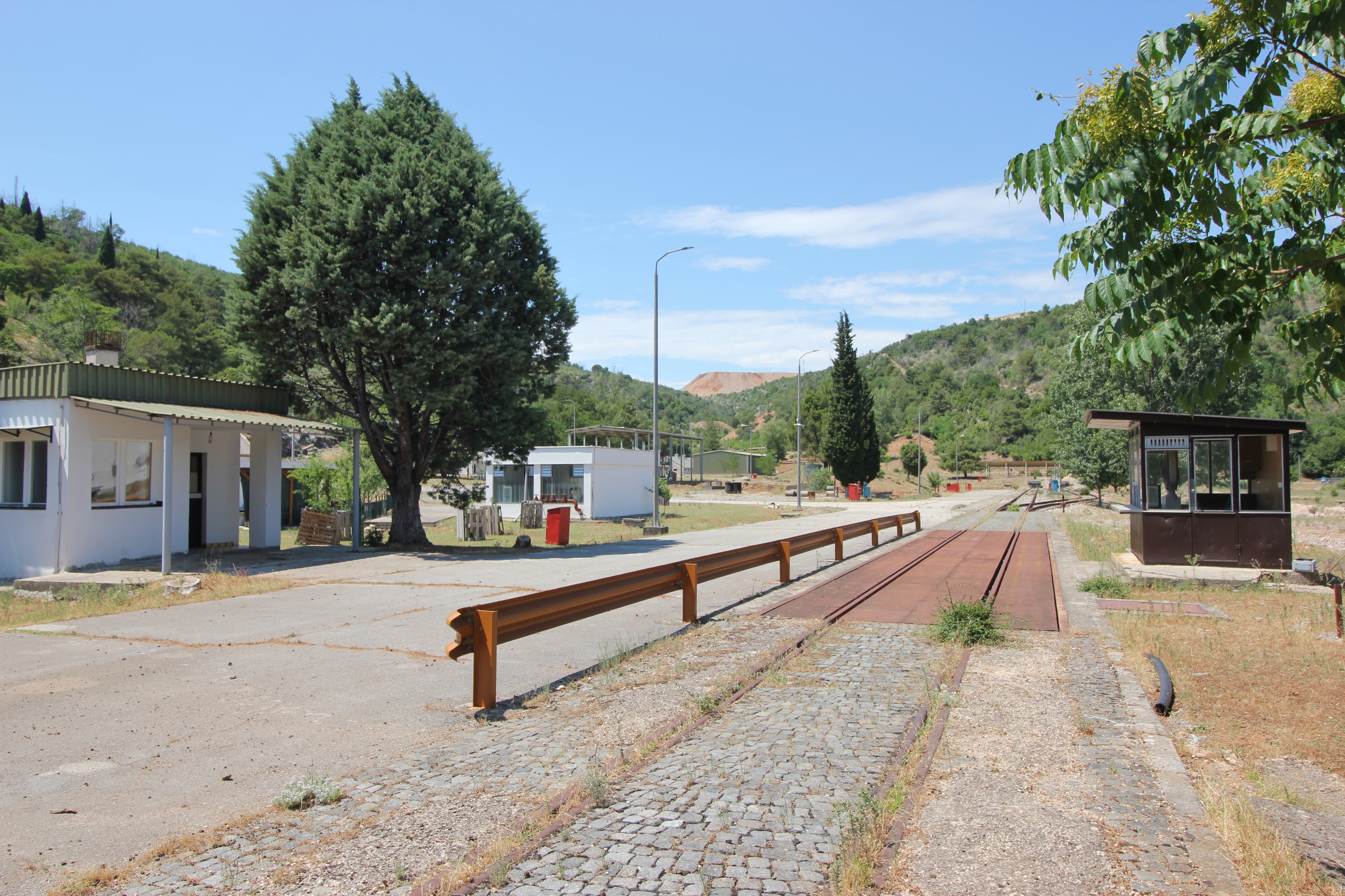
Gateway of former Dretelj prison camp in 2022

The camp was located near Čapljina and Medjugorje in southern Bosnia and Herzegovina. Originally a Yugoslav People's Army barracks, the camp was primarily concrete with six warehouses, along with two concrete tunnels that were dug into the hillsides. Each warehouse was roughly 200 square meters, of which the Bosnian Croats could fit anywhere between 400 and 700 prisoners. During 1992 the HOS detained mostly Serb civilians, who were held in inhumane conditions, while female detainees were raped.

The HVO detained Bosniak men at the Dretelj camp primarily from April to September 1993, with some Bosniaks detained there until approximately April 1994. The prison population at Dretelj Prison peaked on 11 July 1993, when the HVO detained approximately 2,270 Bosniak men at the prison. After that, the detainee population averaged about 1,700 Bosniak men.

During the time from 30 June until mid-July 1993, the Herceg-Bosna/HVO authorities conducted mass arrests of Bosniak men, including Bosniak members of the HVO, and detained many of them at Dretelj Prison. The Herceg-Bosna/HVO authorities held and continued to detain Bosniak men at the Dretelj camp irrespective of their civilian or military status, including a number of boys younger than sixteen and men older than sixty. The Herceg-Bosna/HVO authorities made no bona fide or adequate effort to distinguish military detainees from civilians, or to provide generally for the release of civilian detainees. During August and September 1993, the HVO criteria for releasing Bosnian Muslim men from detention included being married to a Croat woman or possessing a visa and letter of guarantee to leave Bosnia and Herzegovina to another country. Many Bosnian Muslims detained at Dretelj Prison were deported by the Herceg-Bosna/HVO authorities to other countries, via the Republic of Croatia.

Conditions at Dretelj Prison were harsh and unhealthy due to overcrowding, bad ventilation, no beds and insufficient bedding, and inadequate sanitary facilities. The HVO provided the detainees with insufficient food and water and often made them eat under cruel and humiliating circumstances. In the heat of mid-July 1993, the HVO kept detainees locked up without food and water for a number of days, resulting in the death of at least one Bosnian Muslim detainee.

Throughout the time that Bosniaks were detained at Dretelj Prison, HVO members, including the prison warden and members of HVO units not attached to the prison, subjected detainees to torture through beatings and cruel treatment, including constant fear of physical and mental abuse. Bosniak detainees were sometimes forced or instigated to beat or abuse other Bosniak detainees. Bosniak detainees held in the isolation cell were particularly brutalised. Bosniak detainees were harassed, subjected to ethnic insults and humiliated, whipped and hung by their arms for long periods of times.

The HVO acts and practices resulted in the serious injury and occasional death of many Bosniak detainees. At least four Bosniak detainees died at the Dretelj camp as a result of being beaten or shot by HVO members.

== Trials ==
In November 1994, Refic Sarić, a Bosniak prisoner later promoted to guard duty, was found guilty of torturing Bosniaks by a Danish court.

In December 2008, Mirsad Repak, a Bosnian soldier in the Croatian Defence Forces, was found guilty of crimes committed against Serb civilians by a lower Norwegian court. Repak was in 2010 acquitted by the Supreme Court of Norway, of charges relating to war crimes and crimes against humanity. He had been charged with paragraphs of law, which did not exist at the time of his alleged crimes and the conviction was thus not in accordance with the Constitution of Norway. The final judgment in the case fell 13 April 2011. The Supreme Court sentenced Repak to 8 years in prison for "deprivation of freedom resulting in unusual and severe suffering".(Norwegian)

In January 2010, a former camp guard at the Dretelj camp was arrested on suspicion of war crimes. Ahmet Makitan, a Bosniak soldier in the Croatian Defence Forces, was indicted for the kidnapping, torture, assault and abuse of Bosnian Serb prisoners by a Swedish court.

On 2 March 2012, the Prosecution of Bosnia and Herzegovina filed an indictment against, commanders of the Croatian Defence Forces or guards at the camp, Ivan Zelenika, Srećko Herceg, Edib Buljubašić, Ivan Medić and Marina Grubišić-Fejzić on charges of crimes against humanity carried out towards Serbs.

=== ICTY trial ===
Jadranko Prlić, Bruno Stojić, Slobodan Praljak, Milivoj Petković, Valentin Ćorić, and Berislav Pušić were all charged with being part of a joint criminal enterprise from November 1991 to April 1994 to ethnically cleanse non-Croats from certain areas of Bosnia and Herzegovina. The indictment states that members of the enterprise (along with the HVO) set up and ran a network of prison camps, including the Heliodrom camp and Dretelj camp, to arrest, detain and imprison thousands of Bosniaks. Bosniaks in the camps were allegedly starved and subjected to "physical and psychological abuse, including beatings and sexual assaults".

The six accused are charged on the basis of both their individual and superior criminal responsibility under Articles 7(1) and 7(3) of the Statute respectively for:

- nine counts of grave breaches of the Geneva conventions (willful killing; inhuman treatment (sexual assault); unlawful deportation of a civilian; unlawful transfer of a civilian; unlawful confinement of a civilian; inhuman treatment (conditions of confinement); inhuman treatment; extensive destruction of property, not justified by military necessity and carried out unlawfully and wantonly; appropriation of property, not justified by military necessity and carried out unlawfully and wantonly).
- nine counts of violations of the laws or customs of war (cruel treatment (conditions of confinement); cruel treatment; unlawful labour; wanton destruction of cities, towns or villages, or destruction not justified by military necessity; destruction or willful damage done to institutions dedicated to religion or education; plunder of public or private property; unlawful attack on civilians; unlawful infliction of terror on civilians; cruel treatment), and
- eight counts of crimes against humanity (persecutions on political, racial and religious grounds; murder; rape; deportation; inhumane acts (forcible transfer); imprisonment; inhumane acts (conditions of confinement); inhumane acts).

The Swedish former neo-nazi mercenary and later convicted bankrobber and police murderer Jackie Arklöv was stationed at the camp as a guard while he was in the Ludvig Pavlovic unit and was convicted by Swedish court in 2006 for brutal tortures of inmates there, crimes he had been already found guilty of in Bosnia in 1994 but hadn't been punished for in Sweden.

== See also ==
- Bosnian Genocide
- Gabela camp
- Čelebići prison camp
- Heliodrom camp
- Keraterm camp
- Manjača camp
- Omarska camp
- Sušica camp
- Trnopolje camp
- Uzamnica camp
- Vilina Vlas
- Vojno camp
