= Bradina massacre =

Bosnian War atrocity

- Bradina (Bosnia and Herzegovina)
- Location: 43°44′41″N 18°01′08″E; Bradina, Bosnia and Herzegovina
- Date: May 25–27, 1992
- Target: Bosnian Serbs
- Attack type: Mass killing
- Deaths: 48–54
- Perpetrators: Bosniak and Bosnian Croat forces

The Bradina massacre was the mass murder of at least 48 Bosnian Serb civilians by joint Bosniak and Bosnian Croat forces on May 25, 1992, in the village of Bradina, located in the municipality of Konjic, during the Bosnian War.

== Background ==
During the war in Bosnia, Konjic was an important strategic location due to a railway line which passed through Konjic from Ploče, Croatia to central Bosnia, and the M17 highway, located between Mostar and Sarajevo which consisted of many tunnels and bridges, while the municipality also served as an important line of communication from Sarajevo to many other parts of the state in addition to constituting a supply line for Bosnian troops. By mid-April 1992, Serb forces had effectively surrounded Konjic, setting up checkpoints at Bradina to the north, thus controlling the Mount Ivan saddle pass on the M17 road to Sarajevo and also blocking the highway to Mostar from the village of Donje Selo to the west. The Bosnian Territorial Defence Forces (TO) and Croatian Defence Council (HVO) at that time had a common interest in uniting against Serb forces and launched a joint military operation on May 20, 1992, primarily intended to de-block routes to Sarajevo and Mostar after apparent negotiations with Serb leadership failed.

== Operations and killings ==
The village of Bradina was shelled on May 25, 1992, and soldiers in both camouflage and black uniforms appeared, firing their weapons and setting fires to buildings. The local Orthodox church and the village itself was burned to the ground. 48 Serb civilians were killed during the assault. As many as 54 victims are thought to have been killed in three day offensive, during which the perpetrators also dumped 26 of the bodies inside a pit in front of the Orthodox church. Witnesses reported cases in which Muslim fighters forced Serb men to kneel and say Allahu Akbar (God is great) before executing them.

Prior to the Bradina offensive, joint Bosnian Territorial Defense and Croatian Defence Council forces also targeted the surrounding villages of Donje Selo, Cerici, Bjelovcina and Brdani. Many of the men were taken to the Čelebići camp and Musala camp in Konjic. Most of the women and children in Bradina were incarcerated at a local elementary school where they were reportedly mistreated. Approximately 3,000 Serb civilians from Bradina and at least five other villages were also held in a dark railroad tunnel for several days without food or water.

== Arrests and trial ==
On December 4, 2017, the State Investigation and Protection Agency of Bosnia arrested 13 men - all Bosniaks - suspected in taking part in a widespread and systematic attack on the local Bosnian Serb community in the spring and summer of 1992 aimed at expelling them from Konjic, Bradina and surrounding villages. 14 men who held command positions in the Bosnian and Croat forces as well as local police went on trial, 13 Bosniaks and 1 Croat, charged with the murders, detentions, rape, torture and mistreatment of the Serb population in Konjic, as well as burning their property and the local Orthodox church.

== Commemoration ==
On 25 May 2018 the high representative for Bosnia and Herzegovina, Valentin Inzko, attended a memorial service for the victims of the massacre.

== See also ==
- List of massacres in Bosnia and Herzegovina
