= Gabela camp =

Croatian nternment camp for Bosniaks and Serbs

- Internment camp
- Location within Bosnia and Herzegovina
- Coordinates: 43°06′42″N 17°42′19″E
- Location: Near Čapljina, Bosnia and Herzegovina
- Operated by: Croatian Defence Council (HVO)
- Inmates: Bosniaks and Serbs

The Gabela camp or Gabela prison was an internment camp run by the Croatian Republic of Herzeg-Bosnia and Croatian Defence Council in Gabela. The camp was located several kilometres south of Čapljina. Its prisoners were Bosniaks and Serbs.

== The camp ==
The camp consisted of detention facilities and a munitions warehouse. "Outside observers were not allowed to visit Gabela until August 1993. At this time the ICRC registered 1,100 inmates."

The camp facilities were ammunition depots belonging to the former Yugoslav Army, consisting of four hangars marked 0, 1, 2, and 3, and three solitary confinement cells. The hangar size was 200 square metres, and up to 500 persons were held inside each. The detainees were exhausted by starvation and thirst, and were tortured. Ten litres of water were provided per 500 persons per day, so many drank urine to quench their thirst. The detainees had to perform their bodily functions in the hangars. They were forced to sing Croatian nationalist songs and to listen to lectures on how correct Croatian policies were.

Upon entering the camp, detainees were exposed to special forms of torture. They were ordered to lie on their stomachs, and they would then be brutally beaten on their backs and heads. Some had their fingers broken by clamps. In early October, the camp warden, Boško Previšić, killed Mustafa Obradović in front of hangar No. 1, in the presence of a large number of detainees, after discovering a piece of bread concealed on him. Boško was seen talking to war criminal mercenary and murderer Jackie Arklöv in the camp, before and after Arklöv had tortured prisoners.

== Trials ==
The former manager of the Gabela camp Boško Previšić has not been prosecuted and remains a fugitive. His deputy Nikola Andrun was sentenced to 13 years in prison for the crimes against civilians in Gabela by the State Court in Sarajevo.

Former mercenary, Neo-Nazi, convicted bankrobber Jackie Arklöv was stationed at the camp as a guard and was convicted by Swedish court for brutal tortures of inmates there.

== See also ==
- Čelebići prison camp
- Dretelj camp
- Heliodrom camp
- Keraterm camp
- Manjača camp
- Omarska camp
- Musala camp
- Trnopolje camp
- Uzamnica camp
- Vilina Vlas
- Vojno camp

== Vanjski linkovi ==
- Čapljina portal umrli
