= Esad Landžo =

Bosniak war criminal

- Born: 7 March 1973 (age 53); Glavatičevo, Yugoslavia
- Other names: Zenga
- Occupation: Guard at Čelebići camp
- Known for: Torture, murder and crimes against humanity

Esad Landžo (born 7 March 1973) is a Bosnian convicted war criminal and former camp guard at the Čelebići camp during the Bosnian War. He served under this capacity from the camp's establishment until it ceased operations, between May 1992 and December 1992, under the command of the camp's deputy commander Hazim Delić and commander Zdravko Mucić. As a guard, Landžo beat, tortured and murdered Serb prisoners.

On 21 March 1996, the ICTY indicted Landžo, Hazim Delić, Zdravko Mucić and Zejnil Delalić for crimes against humanity at the camp, charging Landžo with the specific murders of five people, four instances of torture and one case of causing great suffering and serious injury. On 16 November 1998, Landžo was found guilty of violations of the laws and customs of war and grave breaches of the Geneva Conventions and sentenced to 15 years in prison. The sentence was later upheld upon appeal. Landžo was granted early release on 13 April 2006 after serving nearly eight years of his sentence.

== Background ==
During the Čelebići trial, the International Criminal Tribunal for the former Yugoslavia established the importance of the Konjic municipality both historically and strategically. Because it lay on the fault line between areas Croats and Serbs considered to be within their spheres of influence, both ethnic groups had a vested geographical interest. More importantly, it was the site of an arms and munitions factory as well as being an important communications link between Mostar and Sarajevo due to its railway line and highway.

As Bosnia descended into war, Konjic was not immune to the tension and suspicion among the ethnic groups. On 17 April 1992, Serb representatives from Konjic's Municipal Assembly and Executive Council walked out following the recognition of Bosnia as an independent state. In the meantime, Muslim and Croat officials formed a War Presidency and an interim "Crisis Staff" to deal with the municipality's administration and defence. By mid-April 1992, Bosnian Serb forces had effectively surrounded the town of Konjic and cut it off from both Sarajevo and Mostar. Muslim and Croat forces began to arrive in the city of Konjic from surrounding villages, while Serb inhabitants moved to Serb-controlled villages. Konjic's defence forces—which at the time consisted of the Territorial Defence Force (TO), the local Croatian Defence Council (HVO) and the Ministry of the Interior (MUP)—attempted to negotiate with the principal representative of the Serbian people, the Serbian Democratic Party (SDS) but these apparent negotiations failed and a military campaign was launched.

Beginning in late May 1992, Bosniak and Croat forces attacked and seized control of certain Serb majority villages in the municipality of Konjic. These operations resulted in the detainment of many members of the Serb population. A former JNA facility located on the outskirts of the village of Čelebići was chosen as the facility to house the prisoners. The majority of the prisoners were men, captured during military operations in these villages, but also included some women who were housed separately. Detainees at the camp were subjected to murder, torture, sexual violence and otherwise cruel and inhumane treatment.

== Profile ==
Esad Landžo, also named Zenga, was born on 7 March 1973 in Glavatičevo, Bosnia and Herzegovina. At the outset of the war, he joined the Bosnian Army and was assigned to be a guard at the Čelebići camp. He served in this capacity from May to December 1992 before joining the military police.

== ICTY trial ==
=== Indictment ===
On 21 March 1996, The ICTY indicted Landžo along with deputy commander Hazim Delić, commander Zdravko Mucić and coordinator of joint Bosniak-Croat forces Zejnil Delalić for their roles in the crimes committed against Serbs at the camp. Landžo was charged with 11 counts of grave breaches of the Geneva Conventions and 15 counts of violations of the laws and customs of war, which included five murders, four acts of torture and one case of causing great suffering and serious injury. On 2 May 1996, Bosnian authorities arrested Landžo and Delić and transferred them to the ICTY on 13 June 1996. Landžo made his first court appearance on 18 June 1996 and pleaded not guilty to the 24 counts of charges. After a request for evaluation from the prosecution, the trial chamber found Landžo fit to stand trial on 23 June 1997.

=== Crimes ===
As camp guard, it was found that Landžo engaged in the abuse of prisoners by practicing torture, cruel treatment and murder. Nedeljko Draganić, a trial witness who was 19 at the time of his incarceration at the camp, described how he was beaten and tortured. Draganić stated that Landžo beat him almost every day, usually using a baseball bat. He described how Landžo and three others tied his hands to a beam above his head and beat him with planks and rifle butts and kicked him until he lost consciousness. In the most egregious instance, Landžo poured alcohol or petrol over him after ordering him to sit with his legs closed and then lit a match to set Draganić's legs on fire. "He did not allow me to put the fire out until it was put out by itself. My trousers were completely burnt out and both my legs had burnt", recalled Draganić who did not receive immediate treatment for his burns, causing him to get an infection. Another witness said that beatings were daily and that Delić and Landžo were the worst offenders.

During the trial, Landžo eventually confessed to the beating and mistreatment of some of the prisoners as well as the murder of two of the five he was charged with, but stated that he could not remember the rest of the crimes. He insisted that the acts were done under the orders of camp superiors. He admitted among other things, to burning detainees on their arms or legs and forcing two brothers to perform fellatio on each other before tying slow-burning fuses to their genitals and lighting them on fire. The trial chamber found that he beat an elderly man and nailed a Serbian Democratic Party badge to his forehead causing him to die from the injuries. He closed a pair of heated pincers against a detainee's tongue, burning his lips, mouth and tongue and then used the pincers to burn the detainee's ears. He cut off a prisoner's air supply using a gas mask and burned his hands, legs and thighs with a heated knife. He also forced a prisoner to do push-ups while kicking him and beating him with a baseball bat.

=== Defence and sentencing ===
Landžo claimed he took part in these acts because he wanted to be a "perfect soldier" and unquestioningly obey orders coming from the camp superiors (Delić and Mucić). Landžo's lawyers argued that he suffered from a mental disorder that affected his sanity when he committed the crimes. Since the ICTY tribunal assumes that perpetrators of human rights violations are healthy and mentally sound, the burden of proof rests on the side making the insanity plea. Ultimately, the defence invoked rule 67 (A)(ii) of the ICTY rules of evidence and procedure to enter a "diminished or lack of mental responsibility" plea. In contrast to an insanity plea, this recognized that the accused was aware of the wrongful nature of his actions but argued that due to the abnormality in the mind, he could not control them. The defence relied on the testimony of five psychiatrists who evaluated Landžo and testified at the trial, yielding varying diagnoses. The court found Landžo guilty, but took into account his young age, immature and fragile personality and mental state when considering his sentencing. On 16 November 1998, the First Trial Chamber found him guilty on 17 counts and sentenced him to 15 years in prison on the basis of his individual responsibility for:

- Violations of the laws and customs of war (Art. 3 ICTY Statute): murder, cruel treatment, torture and pillage;
- Serious breaches of the 1949 Geneva Conventions (Art. 2 ICTY Statute): wilful murder, torture, wilfully causing intense suffering or of inflicting serious bodily injury, and inhumane treatment

On 20 February 2001, Appeal judges quashed charges related to the violations of the laws and customs of war on the basis that they were cumulative and could not be judged on the basis of two separate articles. The same was applied to Delić and Mucić who each received 20 and 7 years respectively while Delalić was previously acquitted. On 9 October 2001, Landžo's sentence of 15 years was reviewed and upheld. On 8 April 2003, the sentence was upheld following an appeal. He was transferred to Finland on 9 July 2003 to serve out the remainder of his sentence.

=== Release ===
On 13 April 2006, he was granted early release which came into effect on 2 May 2006.

== Documentary ==
Landžo is the subject of the 2017 documentary The Unforgiven directed by Lars Feldballe-Petersen which premiered at the Sarajevo Film Festival. In the film, Landzo seeks out former Čelebići prisoners he abused to apologize for his crimes.

He appeared in a French documentary "Ex-Yougoslavie | Les procès du Tribunal pénal international" broadcast on the Arte channel in May 2021 in which he testified about his participation in crimes when he was a camp guard.

== Sources ==
ICTY documents and reports

- "Prosecutor v. Delalic, Mucic, Delic and Landzo (Celebici case), Case no. IT-96-21, Judgement of 16 November 1998" (PDF). ICTY.org. International Criminal Tribunal for the former Yugoslavia. 16 November 1998.
- "Crimes against Serbs in the Čelebići Camp" (PDF). ICTY.org. International Criminal Tribunal for the former Yugoslavia.
- "Čelebići Case Information Sheet" (PDF). ICTY.org. International Criminal Tribunal for the former Yugoslavia.
- "Hazim Delic and Esad Landzo have been transferred to the Tribunal". ICTY.org. International Criminal Tribunal for the former Yugoslavia. 13 June 1996.
- "Nedeljko Draganić Testimony". ICTY.org. International Criminal Tribunal for the former Yugoslavia.

News articles

- "'Perfect Soldier' Confession". Institute for War and Peace Reporting. 1 August 1998.
- Svarm, Filip (2 April 1996). "The Celebic Camp". No. 234. Vreme News Digest. Archived from the original on 29 October 2021.
- "Bosnia war criminals lose appeal". BBC News. 20 February 2001.

Other

- "Esad Landzo". TRIAL International. 9 January 2012. Archived from the original on 8 April 2020.
- Grebo, Lamija (10 August 2017). "A Bosnian War Criminal's Quest for Forgiveness". BalkanInsight. BIRN.

Books

- Krzan, Bartłomiej (2016). Prosecuting International Crimes: A Multidisciplinary Approach. BRILL. ISBN 978-9-00432-366-7.

Journals

- Shniderman, Adam B.; Smith, Charles Anthony (2015). "Towards Justice: Neuroscience and Affirmative Defenses at the ICC". Studies in Law, Politics, and Society. 66: 87–113. doi:10.1108/S1059-433720150000066004. ISBN 978-1-78441-568-6. SSRN 2275098.
