= Hazim Delić =

Bosniak prison administrator

- Born: 13 May 1964 (age 61); Orahovica, SR Bosnia and Herzegovina, SFR Yugoslavia
- Occupations: Deputy Commander of the Čelebići camp and war criminal
- Known for: Torture, murder and crimes against humanity

Hazim Delić (born 13 May 1964) is a Bosnian former prison camp commander who served as the deputy commander of the Čelebići camp, a joint Bosniak and Bosnian Croat forces run prison camp, during the Bosnian War. The majority of the prisoners who were detained in the camp were men, captured during and after the military operations at Bradina and Donje Selo and their surrounding areas.

Delić was convicted of grave breaches of the Geneva Conventions which included the murders, torture, inhuman and cruel treatment of the prisoners as well as the rape of two Serbian women in the camp and sentenced to 20 years by the International Criminal Tribunal for the former Yugoslavia on 16 November 1998, before his sentence was reduced to 18 years following a second sentencing judgement on 9 October 2001. On 24 June 2008, Delić was granted early release.

== Background ==
During the Čelebići trial, the International Criminal Tribunal for the former Yugoslavia established the importance of the Konjic municipality both historically and strategically. Because it lay on the fault line between areas Croats and Serbs considered to be within their spheres of influences, both ethnic groups had a vested geographical interest. More importantly, it was the site of an arms and munitions factory as well as being an important communications link between Mostar and Sarajevo due to its railway line and highway.

As Bosnia descended into war, Konjic was not immune to the tension and suspicion among the ethnic groups. On 17 April 1992, Serb representatives from Konjic's Municipal Assembly and Executive Council walked out following the recognition of Bosnia as an independent state. In the meantime, Muslim and Croat officials formed a War Presidency and an interim "Crisis Staff" to deal with the municipality's administration and defence. By mid-April 1992, Bosnian Serb forces had effectively surrounded the town of Konjic and cut it off from both Sarajevo and Mostar. Muslim and Croat forces began to arrive in the city of Konjic from surrounding villages, while Serb inhabitants moved to Serb-controlled villages. Konjic's defence forces—which at the time consisted of the Territorial Defence Force (TO), the local Croatian Army (HVO) and the Ministry of the Interior (MUP)—attempted to negotiate with the principal representative of the Serbian people, the Serbian Democratic Party (SDS) but these apparent negotiations failed and a military campaign was launched.

Beginning in late May 1992, Bosniak and Croat forces attacked and seized control of certain Serb majority villages in the municipality of Konjic. These operations resulted in the detainment of many members of the Serb population. A former JNA facility located on the outskirts of the village of Čelebići was chosen as the facility to house the prisoners. The majority of the prisoners were men, captured during military operations in these villages, but also included some women who were housed separately. Detainees at the camp were subjected to murder, torture, sexual violence and otherwise cruel and inhumane treatment.

== Trial and conviction ==
On 21 March 1996, The ICTY indicted Delić along with Esad Landžo, Zdravko Mucić and Zejnil Delalić for their roles in the crimes committed against Serbs at the camp. Delić was the deputy commander of the Čelebići camp from May 1992 to November 1992. Afterwards, he was the commander until its closure in December 1992, following the departure of Zdravko Mucić. Delić was arrested by the authorities of Bosnia-Herzegovina on 2 May 1996 and transferred to the ICTY (International Criminal Tribunal for the former Yugoslavia) on 13 June 1996.

Delić, Mucić and Delalić were accused of failing to take the necessary and reasonable measures to prevent or to punish those who mistreated the detainees from their superior positions of authority. The ICTY noted the murders of at least 14 detainees and seven specific acts of torture. Additionally, in the case of Delić, he was also charged with direct involvement in four murders, five specific acts of torture, including two rapes and one case of causing great suffering or serious injury. Reporting on the case, BBC News noted that Delić took "sadistic pleasure" in the abuse of prisoners.

On 16 November 1998, the ICTY delivered its verdict on the Čelebići case. Delić was found guilty to a part of the charges and sentenced to 20 years in prison on the basis of individual responsibility and hierarchical superiority for:

- Violations of the laws and customs of war (Art. 3 ICTY Statute): murder, cruel treatment, torture and pillage;
- Serious breaches of the 1949 Geneva Conventions (Art. 2 ICTY Statute): wilful murder, torture, wilfully causing intense suffering or of inflicting serious bodily injury, and inhumane treatment

It was found that he beat one detainee over the course of several days which resulted in his death. He beat a detainee with a number of objects, including shovels and electric wires. He placed severe restrictions on the amount of water which could be drunk by detainees, despite there being no shortage of water available. He also violently raped two women in the camp.

Delić's sentence was reduced to 18 years following a second sentencing judgement on 9 October 2001. He was transferred to Finland on 9 July 2003 to serve out the remainder of his sentence.

On 24 June 2008, Delić was granted early release, based on credit given for time served in detention since 2 May 1996.

== See also ==
- List of ICTY indictees

== Sources ==
ICTY documents and reports

- "Prosecutor v. Delalic, Mucic, Delic and Landzo (Celebici case), Case no. IT-96-21, Judgement of 16 November 1998" (PDF). ICTY.org. International Criminal Tribunal for the former Yugoslavia. 16 November 1998.
- "Crimes against Serbs in the Čelebići Camp" (PDF). ICTY.org. International Criminal Tribunal for the former Yugoslavia.
- "International Tribunal issues first indictment dealing with Bosnian-Serb victims". ICTY.org. International Criminal Tribunal for the former Yugoslavia. 22 March 1996.
- "Čelebići Case Information Sheet" (PDF). ICTY.org. International Criminal Tribunal for the former Yugoslavia.
- "Hazim Delic and Esad Landzo have been transferred to the Tribunal". ICTY.org. International Criminal Tribunal for the former Yugoslavia. 13 June 1996.
- "Sentencing judgement in the Celebici Case". ICTY.org. International Criminal Tribunal for the former Yugoslavia. 9 October 2001.

News articles

- "Bosnia war criminals lose appeal". BBC News. 20 February 2001.

Other

- "Hazim Delic". TRIAL International. 3 May 2016. Archived from the original on 9 July 2016.
