= Cerići =

Cerići Церићи
- Village
- Location within Bosnia and Herzegovina
- Coordinates: 43°40′43″N 17°55′40″E
- Country: Bosnia and Herzegovina
- Entity: Federation of Bosnia and Herzegovina
- Canton: Herzegovina-Neretva
- Municipality: Konjic

Area
  - Total: 0.85 sq mi (2.21 km^{2})

Population (2013)
  - Total: 52
  - Density: 61/sq mi (24/km^{2})
- Time zone: UTC+1 (CET)
  - Summer (DST): UTC+2 (CEST)

Cerići (Cyrillic: Церићи) is a village in the municipality of Konjic, Bosnia and Herzegovina.

== Demographics ==
According to the 2013 census, its population was 52.

Ethnicity in 2013
Ethnicity	Number	Percentage
Bosniaks	27	51.9%
Serbs	15	28.8%
other/undeclared	10	19.2%
Total	52	100%
