= Donje Selo, Konjic =

Donje Selo Доње Село
- Village
- Location within Bosnia and Herzegovina
- Coordinates: 43°40′10″N 17°56′33″E
- Country: Bosnia and Herzegovina
- Entity: Federation of Bosnia and Herzegovina
- Canton: Herzegovina-Neretva
- Municipality: Konjic

Area
  - Total: 1.15 sq mi (2.97 km^{2})

Population (2013)
  - Total: 202
  - Density: 176/sq mi (68.0/km^{2})
- Time zone: UTC+1 (CET)
  - Summer (DST): UTC+2 (CEST)

Donje Selo (Serbian Cyrillic: Доње Село) is a village in the municipality of Konjic, Bosnia and Herzegovina.

== Demographics ==
According to the 2013 census, its population was 202.

Ethnicity in 2013
| Ethnicity | Number | Percentage |
|---|---|---|
| Bosniaks | 177 | 87.6% |
| Croats | 11 | 5.4% |
| Serbs | 14 | 6.9% |
| Total | 202 | 100% |
