= Manjača camp =

Serbian concentration camp during the Bosnian War

Coordinates: 44°39′21″N 17°01′37″E

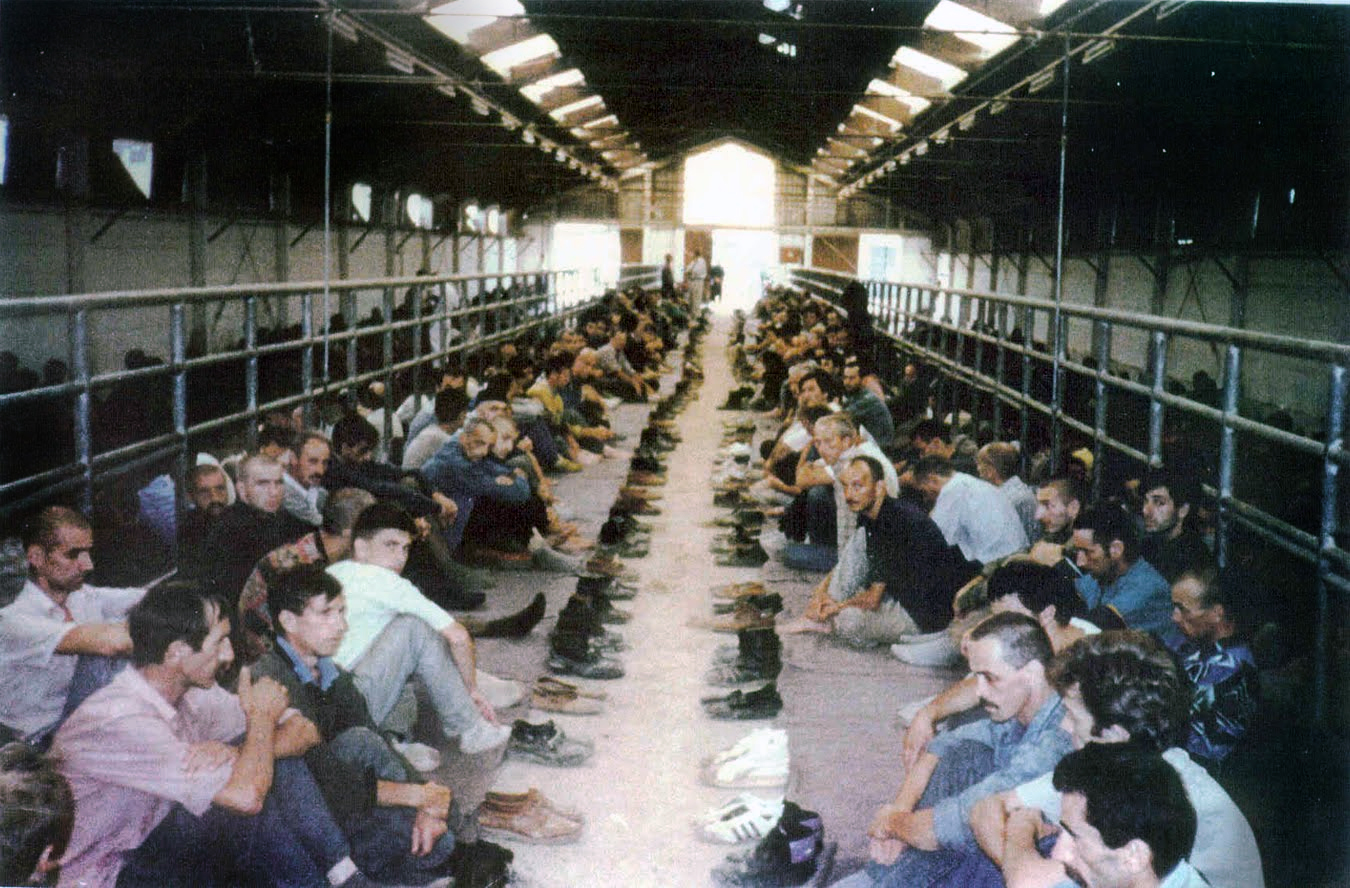
Detainees in Manjača, near Banja Luka, Bosnia and Herzegovina

Manjača was a concentration camp which was located on mount Manjača near the city of Banja Luka in northern Bosnia and Herzegovina during the Bosnian War and the Croatian War of Independence from 1991 to 1995. The camp was founded by the Yugoslav People's Army (JNA) and authorities of the Republika Srpska (RS) and was used to collect and confine thousands of male prisoners of Bosniak and Croat nationalities.

The camp was shut down under international pressure in late 1993 but was reopened in October 1995. At that time, it was estimated that a total of between 4,500 and 6,000 non-Serbs primarily from the Sanski Most and Banja Luka areas passed through the camp.

In early 1996, both the former concentration camp and the neighbouring army camp were opened to IFOR personnel for inspection following the Dayton Agreement.

== Background ==
The Manjača camp began its operation during the 1991 Croatian War between JNA and Croatian forces. At that time numerous Croatian prisoners of war were held at the camp. With the start of Bosnian War in early 1992 the camp began to admit civilian predominantly Bosniak detainees.

According to the International Committee of the Red Cross there were 3,737 prisoners held at Manjača camp. Exact number of people held at this camp is somewhat of an uncertainty since detainees were continually transferred between other camps including Omarska camp, Trnopolje camp and Keraterm camp. The camp was the site of human rights abuses, namely the regular and systematic beatings and killings of detainees, resulting in indictments and convictions by the ICTY United Nations tribunal for former Yugoslavia. Most reports indicate that the camp contained male prisoners of all ages but mostly between the ages of 18 and 60. However, there are allegations that in the early spring of 1992, a number of women were held at the camp and raped.

According to a report of the United Nations Commission on Human Rights, the administrators of this facility who were officials of the army of the RS, maintained that the prisoners were prisoners of war. However, other observers consider that most of them probably never bore arms, and were detained simply because their age and Bosniak ethnic origin made them potential combatants in the eyes of the Serbian authorities.

In the detention facilities, many prisoners were killed, tortured, and subjected to other inhumane treatment by RS forces especially targeting prominent individuals, such as intellectual, professional, business, political and religious leaders. At a minimum, during the period from late May 1992 to early August 1992, hundreds of detainees, identities of many of whom are known, died. Almost all of the survivors were eventually forcibly transferred or deported from the area.

== The Judgment of the ICJ ==
The International Court of Justice (ICJ) presented its judgment in Bosnian Genocide Case on 26 February 2007, in which it had examined atrocities committed in detention camps, including Manjača, in relation to Article II (b) of the Genocide Convention. The Court stated in its judgment:

Having carefully examined the evidence presented before it, and taken note of that presented to the ICTY, the Court considers that it has been established by fully conclusive evidence that members of the protected group were systematically victims of massive mistreatment, beatings, rape and torture causing serious bodily and mental harm during the conflict and, in particular, in the detention camps. The requirements of the material element, as defined by Article II (b) of the Convention are thus fulfilled. The Court finds, however, on the basis of evidence before it, that it has not been conclusively established that those atrocities, although they too may amount to war crimes and crimes against humanity, were committed with the specific intent (dolus specialis) to destroy the protected group, in whole or in part, required for a finding that genocide has been perpetrated.

== Recent developments ==
Some of the RS officials responsible for running the camp have since been indicted for genocide, crimes against humanity and war crimes including Milomir Stakić and Stojan Župljanin. Some have been convicted while others are still awaiting trials at the ICTY.

== See also ==
- Bosnian Genocide
- Persecution of Muslims
- Dretelj camp
- Čelebići prison camp
- Gabela camp
- Heliodrom camp
- Keraterm camp
- Omarska camp
- Trnopolje camp
- Uzamnica camp
- Vilina Vlas
- Vojno camp
