= Borci, Konjic =

Borci
- Village
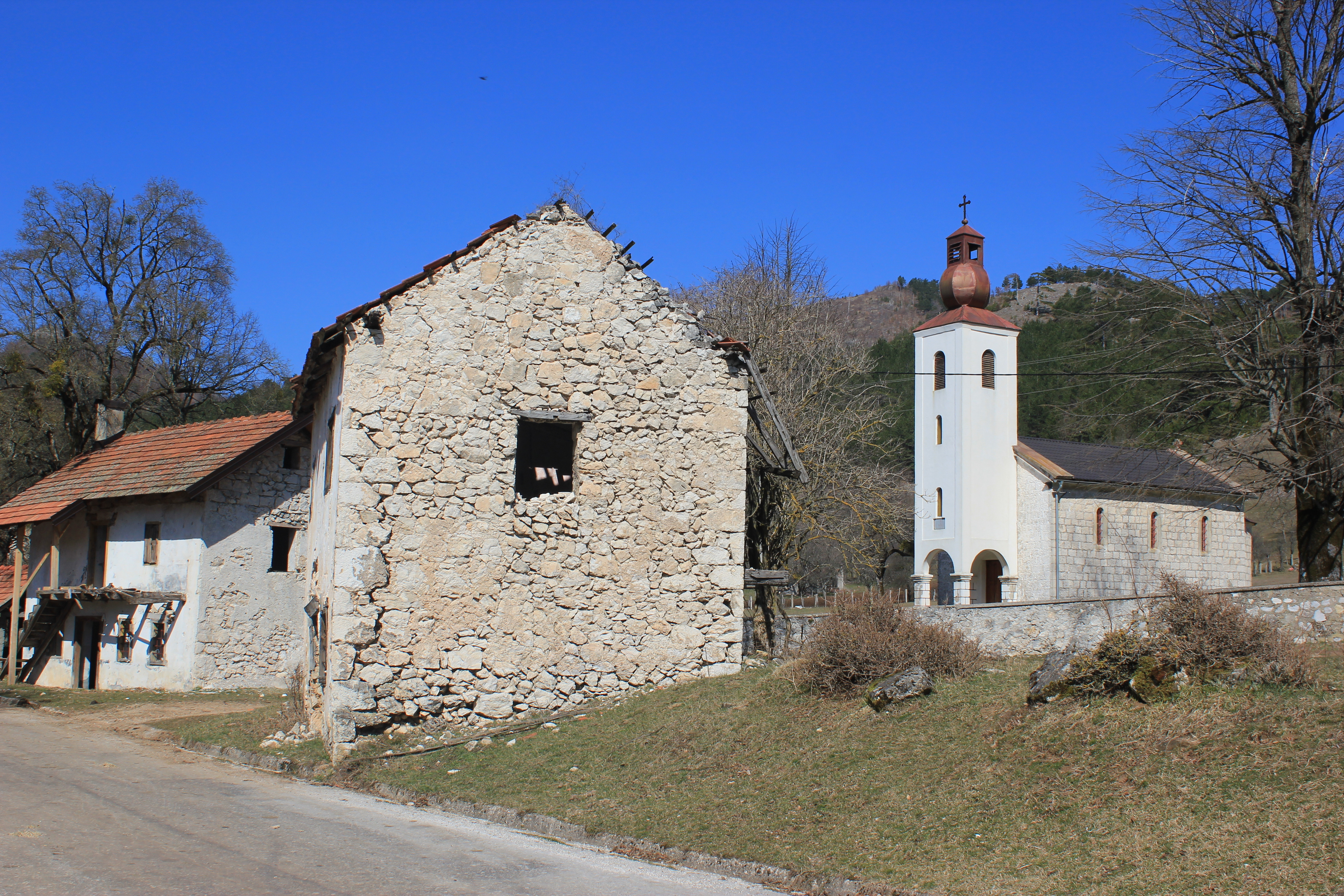
- In Borci

- Location within Bosnia and Herzegovina
- Country: Bosnia and Herzegovina
- Entity: Federation of Bosnia and Herzegovina
- Canton: Herzegovina-Neretva
- Municipality: Konjic

Area
  - Total: 17.69 sq mi (45.82 km^{2})

Population (2013)
  - Total: 30
  - Density: 1.7/sq mi (0.65/km^{2})
- Time zone: UTC+1 (CET)
  - Summer (DST): UTC+2 (CEST)

Borci is a village in the municipality of Konjic, Bosnia and Herzegovina.

== Name ==
The name of this small village means "fighters" in the native language

== Demographics ==
According to the 2013 census, its population was 30.

Ethnicity in 2013
Ethnicity	Number	Percentage
Bosniaks	19	63.3%
Serbs	7	23.3%
other/undeclared	4	13.3%
Total	30	100%
