= Heliodrom camp =

Detention camp in Rodoč, Bosnia and Herzegovina (1992-94)

- Prison camp
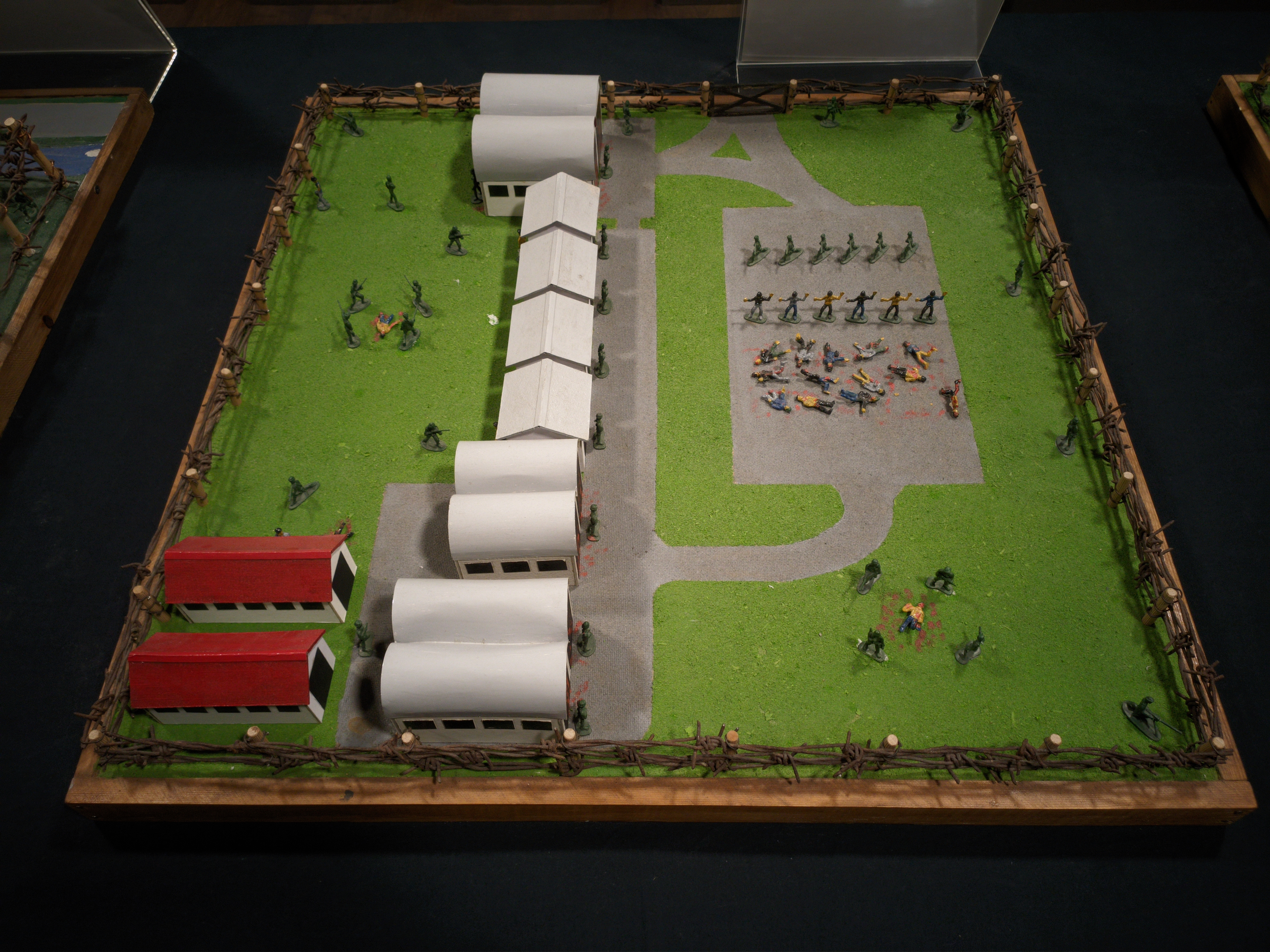
- Camp model exhibited in the Museum of Crimes against Humanity and Genocide.

- Location within Bosnia and Herzegovina
- Coordinates: 43°20′46″N 17°48′52″E
- Location: Rodoč, Bosnia and Herzegovina
- Operated by: Croatian Defence Council and Military Police
- Operational: September 1992 – April 1994
- Inmates: Bosniaks and Bosnian Serbs, other non-Croats
- Killed: 31–54

The Heliodrom camp (Serbo-Croatian: Logor Heliodrom, Логор Хелиодром) or Heliodrom prison was a detention camp that operated between September 1992 and April 1994. It was run by the Military Police of the Croatian Republic of Herzeg-Bosnia to detain Bosniaks, Serbs, and other non-Croats and was located at a former military facility of the JNA in Rodoč, south of the town of Mostar.

== The camp ==
The camp consisted of a sports hall and a three-story central prison building. Conditions at the Heliodrom camp were inhumane, with severe overcrowding, inadequate medical and sanitary facilities, insufficient food and water, inadequate ventilation, and in the summer, suffocating heat. Detainees often slept on concrete floors with no bedding or blankets. On some occasions, HVO guards withheld all food and water from the detainees, in retaliation for HVO military setbacks.

Herceg-Bosna/HVO forces regularly mistreated and abused, and allowed the mistreatment and abuse of, Bosniak detainees, both at the Heliodrom itself and at various locations where detainees were taken for forced labour or other purposes. There was regular cruel treatment and infliction of great suffering, with HVO soldiers and guards routinely beating detainees, often to the point of unconsciousness and severe injuries. Bosniak detainees lived in constant fear of physical and mental abuse. Bosniak detainees were often humiliated in various ways, including being forced to sing nationalistic Croatian songs. On 5 July 1993, HVO members fired indiscriminately at the building in which the detainees were being held. It is not known whether there were injuries.

Bosniak men were held and continued to be detained at the Heliodrom camp without any bona fide or adequate effort by the Herceg-Bosna/HVO authorities or forces to distinguish, classify or separate military prisoners from civilian detainees, or to provide for the release of civilian detainees.

In the Prlić et al. case, the Chamber found that several dozen detainees on forced labour were killed or wounded due to military confrontation while working on the front line. It also found that at least three Bosniak detainees were injured and four were killed while being used as human shields in combat. The Prosecution claimed in the indictment that at least fifty-four Bosniak detainees died as a result of being detained at this facility and at least 178 were wounded on forced labor or as human shields.

== Recent developments ==
Jadranko Prlić, Bruno Stojić, Slobodan Praljak, Milivoj Petković, Valentin Corić, and Berislav Pušić were all charged with being part of a joint criminal enterprise from November 1991 to April 1994 to ethnically cleanse non-Croats from certain areas of Bosnia and Herzegovina. The indictment states that members of the enterprise (along with the HVO) set up and ran a network of prison camps, including the Heliodrom camp and Dretelj camp, to arrest, detain and imprison thousands of Bosniaks. Bosniaks in the camps were allegedly starved and subjected to "physical and psychological abuse, including beatings and sexual assaults".

The six accused were charged on the basis of both their individual and superior criminal responsibility under Articles 7(1) and 7(3) of the Statute respectively for:

- nine counts of grave breaches of the Geneva Conventions (willful killing; inhuman treatment (sexual assault); unlawful deportation of a civilian; unlawful transfer of a civilian; unlawful confinement of a civilian; inhuman treatment (conditions of confinement); inhuman treatment; extensive destruction of property, not justified by military necessity and carried out unlawfully and wantonly; appropriation of property, not justified by military necessity and carried out unlawfully and wantonly).
- nine counts of violations of the laws or customs of war (cruel treatment (conditions of confinement); cruel treatment; unlawful labour; wanton destruction of cities, towns or villages, or destruction not justified by military necessity; destruction or willful damage done to institutions dedicated to religion or education; plunder of public or private property; unlawful attack on civilians; unlawful infliction of terror on civilians; cruel treatment), and
- eight counts of crimes against humanity (persecutions on political, racial and religious grounds; murder; rape; deportation; inhumane acts (forcible transfer); imprisonment; inhumane acts (conditions of confinement); inhumane acts).

== See also ==
- Bosnian genocide
- Dretelj camp
- Čelebići prison camp
- Gabela camp
- Keraterm camp
- Manjača camp
- Omarska camp
- Trnopolje camp
- Uzamnica camp
- Vilina Vlas
- Vojno camp
- Velepromet camp
