= Vinište, Konjic =

Vinište Виниште
- Village
- Location within Bosnia and Herzegovina
- Coordinates: 43°41′05″N 17°56′59″E
- Country: Bosnia and Herzegovina
- Entity: Federation of Bosnia and Herzegovina
- Canton: Herzegovina-Neretva
- Municipality: Konjic

Area
  - Total: 1.06 sq mi (2.75 km^{2})

Population (2013)
  - Total: 5
  - Density: 4.7/sq mi (1.8/km^{2})
- Time zone: UTC+1 (CET)
  - Summer (DST): UTC+2 (CEST)

Vinište (Cyrillic: Виниште) is a village in the municipality of Konjic, Bosnia and Herzegovina.

== Demographics ==
According to the 2013 census, its population was 5.

Ethnicity in 2013
Ethnicity	Number	Percentage
Serbs	3	60.0%
Croats	2	40.0%
Total	5	100%
