= Musala camp =

Prison camp in Bosnia and Herzegovina

- Detainment camp
- Location within Bosnia and Herzegovina
- Coordinates: 43°39′05″N 17°57′52″E
- Location: Konjic, Bosnia and Herzegovina
- Operated by: Army of the Republic of Bosnia and Herzegovina
- Operational: May 1992–October 1994
- Inmates: Serbs and Croats
- Killed: 13

The Musala camp was a prison camp in Konjic, Bosnia and Herzegovina operated by the Army of the Republic of Bosnia and Herzegovina (ARBiH) that was used to detain Bosnian Serbs and Bosnian Croats.

== History ==
The Serb prisoners were initially captured during joint military operations conducted by joint Croatian Defence Council (HVO) and Bosnian Territorial Defence Forces (TO) in villages surrounding the municipality of Konjic in May 1992. While many of the men were taken to the Čelebići camp, some were transported to the Musala sports hall in Konjic. The sports hall was converted into a detention facility. With the Croat-Bosniak War, the camp would also be used for the detainment of Croats by the ARBiH.

According to witnesses, on 15 June 1992, detainees were ordered to take their seats in the camp gym during a shelling of the camp by the ARBiH, thus preventing them to take cover while the camp guards went to take cover in a safer place. As a result, 13 Serb prisoners were killed while dozens of others were severely or lightly wounded.

In July 2013, Ibro Macić, a former ARBiH member, was charged with inhumane treatment and mistreatment of prisoners at the camp from April to October 1993. According to the indictment, Macić, along with some other Bosnian Army servicemen, ordered sexual assaults on four prisoners. They were beaten, sexually abused and had their genitals burned. In 2015, Macić was sentenced to ten years in prison after being found guilty of participating in the mistreatment and physical, mental, and sexual abuse of several Serb and Croat prisoners. Macić was also found guilty for the massacre of four elderly Serb women in the village of Blaca.

In 2016, former military policeman Edhem Žilić was charged with war crimes against civilians in the Konjic area, including the beating and abuse of Croat and Serb detainees at the camp. Žilić, who was the acting manager of the facility, was convicted in November 2017 and sentenced to nine years; his sentence was reduced following an appeal to six years in May 2018.
