= Bradina, Konjic =

Bradina Брадина
- Village
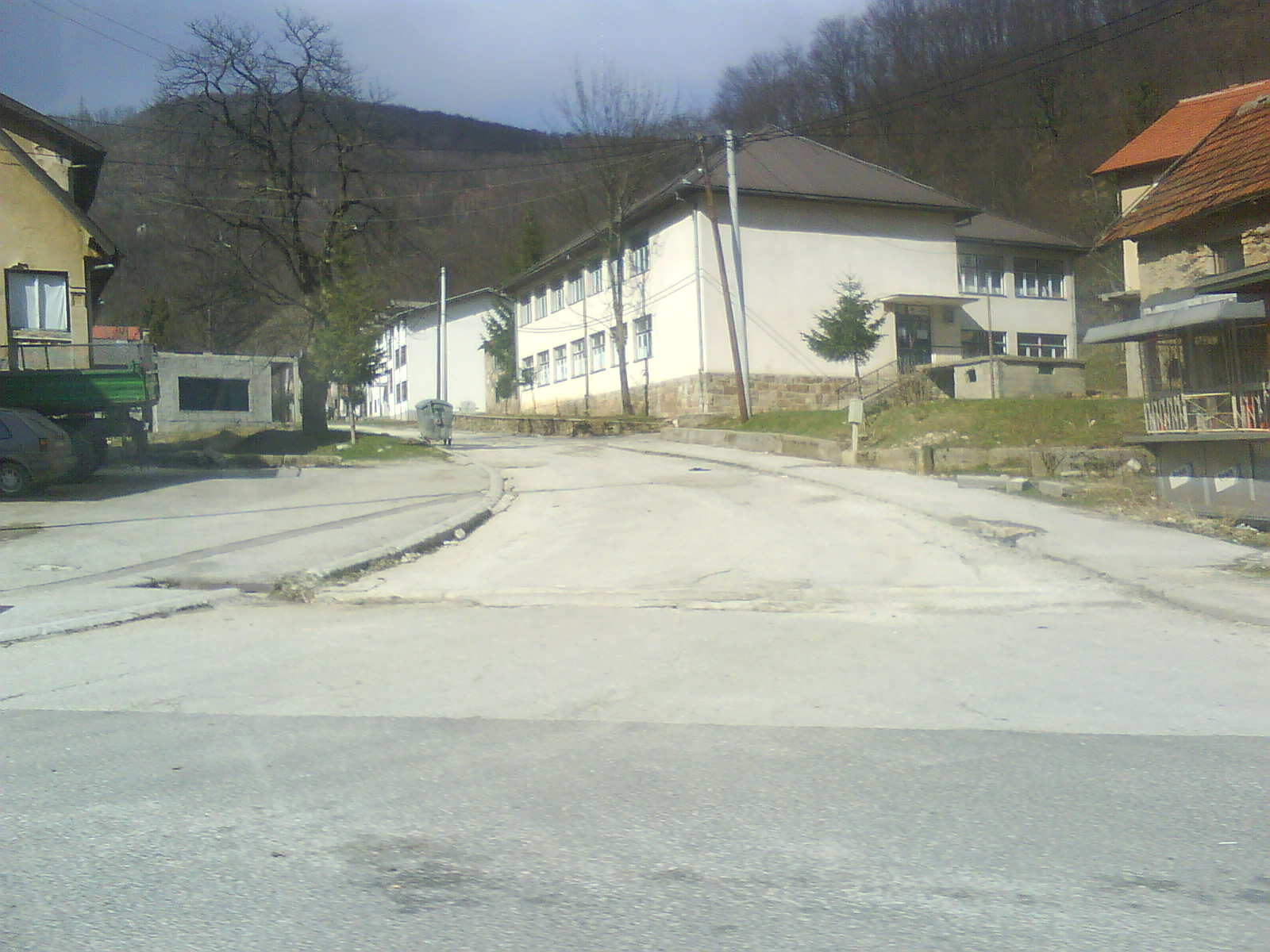

- Location within Bosnia and Herzegovina
- Coordinates: 43°44′41″N 18°01′08″E
- Country: Bosnia and Herzegovina
- Entity: Federation of Bosnia and Herzegovina
- Canton: Herzegovina-Neretva
- Municipality: Konjic

Area
  - Total: 7.59 sq mi (19.67 km^{2})

Population (2013)
  - Total: 72
  - Density: 9.5/sq mi (3.7/km^{2})
- Time zone: UTC+1 (CET)
  - Summer (DST): UTC+2 (CEST)

Bradina (Serbian Cyrillic: Брадина) is a village in the municipality of Konjic in Herzegovina, Federation of Bosnia and Herzegovina, Bosnia and Herzegovina.

== History ==
In May 1992, forty-eight Bosnian Serb civilians were killed in Bradina by the Army of Bosnia and Herzegovina and the Croatian Defence Council.

== Population ==
Bradina
Census year	1971	1981	1991	2013
Serbs	724 (87.65%)	620 (88.57%)	603 (90.67%)	3 (4.2%)
Croats	64 (7.74%)	44 (6.28%)	32 (4.81%)	3 (4.2%)
Bosniaks	36 (4.35%)	14 (2.00%)	16 (2.40%)	66 (91.7%)
Yugoslavs	0	22 (3.14%)	12 (1.80%)	
others	2 (0.24%)	0	2 (0.30%)	
Total	826	700	665	72

== Notable people ==
- Ante Pavelić, founder of the Croatian nationalist Ustaše movement and leader of the Independent State of Croatia during World War II

== Sources ==
- Nacionalni sastav stanovništva - Rezultati za Republiku po opštinama i naseljenim mjestima 1991., statistički bilten br. 234, Izdanje Državnog zavoda za statistiku Republike Bosne i Hercegovine, Sarajevo. ("Ethnic composition of the population - results, by municipalities and settlements in 1991", Statistical Bulletin no. 234, Issue of the Central Bureau of Statistics of Bosnia and Herzegovina, Sarajevo.
- List of the local communities
