= Orahovica, Konjic =

Orahovica Ораховица
- Village
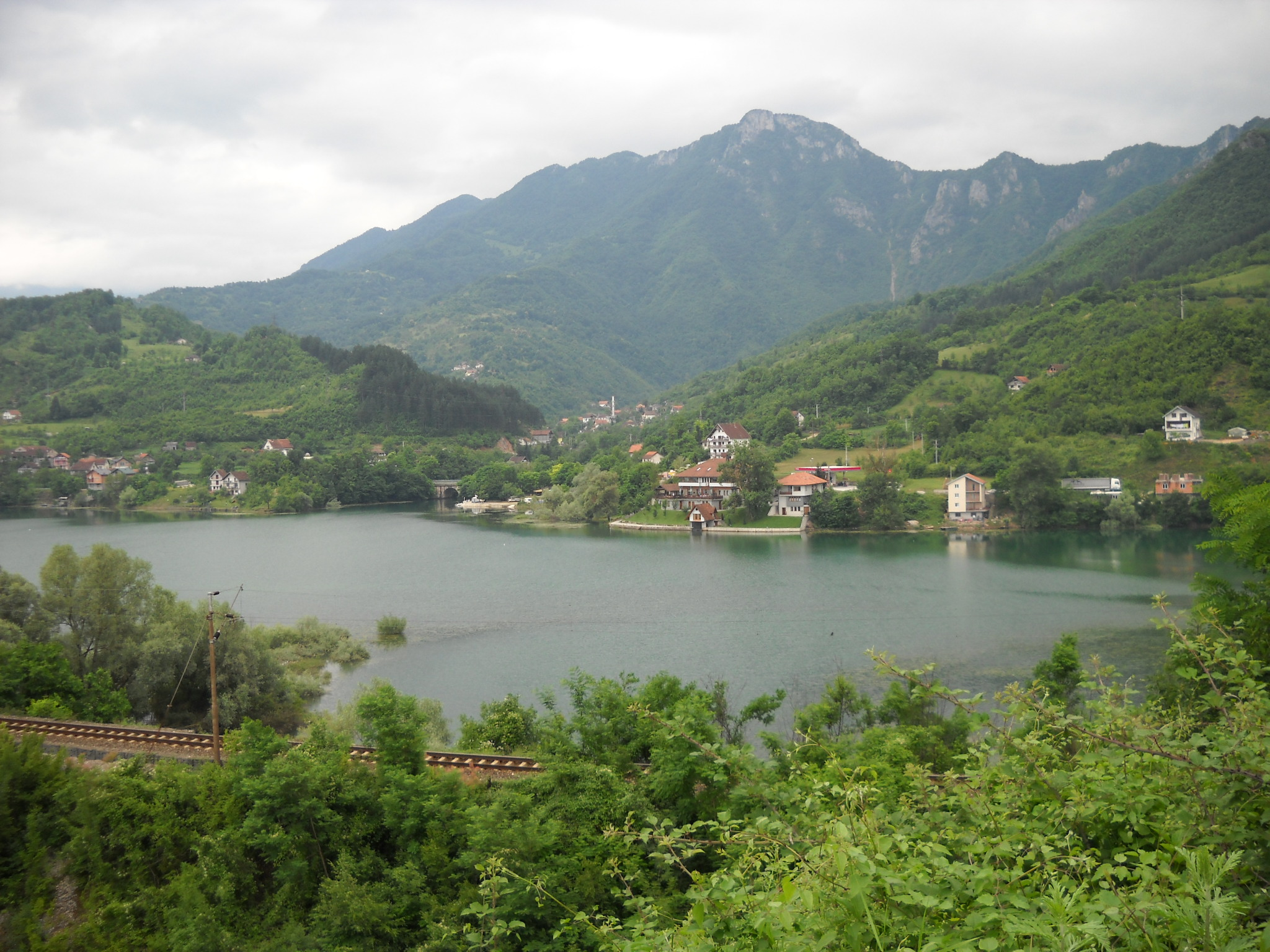
- View of Orahovica Konjic

- Location within Bosnia and Herzegovina
- Coordinates: 43°40′14″N 17°54′57″E
- Country: Bosnia and Herzegovina
- Entity: Federation of Bosnia and Herzegovina
- Canton: Herzegovina-Neretva
- Municipality: Konjic

Area
  - Total: 4.02 sq mi (10.41 km^{2})
- Elevation: 1,667 ft (508 m)

Population (2013)
  - Total: 570
  - Density: 140/sq mi (55/km^{2})
- Time zone: UTC+1 (CET)
  - Summer (DST): UTC+2 (CEST)

Orahovica (Cyrillic: Ораховица) is a village in the municipality of Konjic, Bosnia and Herzegovina.

== Demographics ==
According to the 2013 census, its population was 570.

Ethnicity in 2013
Ethnicity	Number	Percentage
Bosniaks	514	90.2%
Croats	53	9.3%
Serbs	2	0.4%
other/undeclared	1	0.2%
Total	570	100%
