= Keraterm concentration camp =

1992–1994 Bosnian Serb concentration camp

Keraterm
- concentration camp
- Location within Bosnia and Herzegovina
- Coordinates: 44°58′37.0″N 16°43′45.3″E
- Location: near Prijedor, Bosnia and Herzegovina
- Operated by: Bosnian Serb military and police authorities
- Original use: Ceramic tile factory
- Operational: 1992–94
- Inmates: Bosniaks and Bosnian Croats
- Number of inmates: 1,000–1,500
- Killed: 150

The Keraterm camp was a concentration camp established by Republika Srpska military and police authorities near the town of Prijedor in northern Bosnia and Herzegovina during the Bosnian War. The camp was used to collect and confine between 1,000 and 1,500 Bosniak and Bosnian Croat civilians.

== The camp ==
The Keraterm camp was located on the site of a ceramics factory, just outside the city of Prijedor. According to reports, prisoners were kept in four halls, formerly used as storehouses at the ceramics factory. The Keraterm camp's prisoner population was all male. Most of the men at the camp were reported to be between the ages of 15 and 60. However, in mid-July 1992, approximately 12 to 15 Bosniak women were brought to Keraterm, raped, and transported to the Omarska camp. About 85% of all prisoners were Bosniaks while about 15% were Bosnian Croats.

According to the indictment, the detainees were, among other things, subjected to physical violence, constant humiliation, degradation, inhumane conditions, and fear of death. Severe beatings were commonplace. All manner of weapons were used during these beatings, including wooden batons, metal rods, baseball bats, lengths of thick industrial cable that had metal balls affixed to the end, rifle butts, and knives. Killings, beatings, sexual assaults, and other cruel and humiliating actions were committed.

== War crime trials ==
The Republika Srpska officials responsible for running the camp have since been convicted for genocide, crimes against humanity and war crimes. Dušan Knežević was found guilty of the criminal offence of Crimes against Humanity and sentenced him to a long-term imprisonment of 31 years. Željko Mejakić was found guilty for the criminal offense of Crimes against Humanity and sentenced him to the long-term imprisonment of 21 years. Duško Sikirica, commander of the Keraterm camp, pleaded guilty to crimes against humanity and was sentenced to a jail term of fifteen years. Dušan Fuštar was found guilty for having participated, by acting and failing to act, in a joint criminal enterprise and sentenced him to 9 years imprisonment for "having failed to exercise his authority and prevent the crimes." Predrag Banović who pleaded guilty to 25 charges and was sentenced to 8 years in prison. Damir Došen was sentenced to 5 years imprisonment. Dragan Kolundžija was sentenced to 3 years imprisonment.

== See also ==
- Batković concentration camp
- Dretelj camp
- Čelebići prison camp
- Gabela camp
- Heliodrom camp
- Liplje camp
- Manjača camp
- Omarska camp
- Trnopolje camp
- Uzamnica camp
- Vilina Vlas
- Vojno camp
