= List of massacres during the Bosnian War =

The following is a list of massacres that occurred during the Bosnian War.

== Incidents ==
Name	Date	Location	Perpetrators	Victims	Deaths	Description
Sijekovac massacre	26 March 1992	Sijekovac, near Bosanski Brod	TORBiH, HVO	Serbs	9–20	Nine Serb civilians killed after an attack in the village of Sijekovac. In 2020, The Centre for the Investigation of War Crimes in Republika Srpska alleged that the factions who participated in the attack were regular Croatian Army (HVO) forces, Croatian National Guard (ZNG) members and Croatian Defence Forces paramilitaries and that an additional 11 civilians were killed in a subsequent attack. A 2004 exhumation unearthed 59 bodies of war victims, but they are believed to have been Roma people, including some 20 children, who were killed in May 1992.
Sanski Most ethnic cleansing	1992–1995	Sanski Most	VRS	Bosniaks, Croats	927	Around 842 Bosniak and 85 Croat civilians were killed by the VRS and Arkan's Tigers.
Doboj ethnic cleansing (1992)	April – October 1992	Doboj municipality	VRS	Bosniaks, Croats	408	322 Bosniak and 86 Croat civilians killed by Bosnian Serb forces.
Doboj shelling	1992–1994	Doboj	ARBiH	Serbs	99	ARBiH shells Doboj in 1992 and 1994, and kills 99 Bosnian Serb civilians, and 399 seriously wounded.
Bosanski Šamac ethnic cleansing	April–November 1992	Bosanski Šamac municipality	VRS, JNA	Bosniaks, Croats	126	Persecution and killings of Bosniaks and Croats committed by JNA and Bosnian Serb forces in the area of Bosanski Šamac.
Bijeljina massacre	1–2 April 1992	Bijeljina	VRS, JNA	Bosniaks	48–78 non-Serbs, mostly Bosniaks	Perpetrated by Arkan's Tigers, under the command of the Serb-controlled JNA
Kupres massacre	3–10 April 1992	Kupres	ARBiH, HVO	Serbs	61–72	HVO and HOS killed 11 Serb civilians in the village of Donji Malovan. During the killings, another 40 Serb civilians were killed in the town of Kupres and another 10 in the surrounding villages.
Kazani pit massacres	April 1992–October 1993	Sarajevo	ARBiH	Serbs	150–200 predominantly Serb civilians	During the Siege of Sarajevo, the forces of Mušan Topalović (nickname Caco), commander of the 10th Mountain Brigade in the Army of the Republic of Bosnia and Herzegovina, engage in a campaign of mass murder primarily targeting Sarajevo Serbs living in Bosniak-held areas.
Foča ethnic cleansing	7 April 1992–January 1994	Foča	VRS	Bosniaks	2,704	Serb military, police and paramilitary forces kill Bosniak civilians. In a 1997 judgement against Novislav Đajić, the Bavarian Appeals Chamber ruled that the killings in which he was involved in June 1992 were acts of genocide.
Kolibe massacre	16 April 1992	Gornje Kolibe and Donje Kolibe	VRS	Bosniaks, Croats	23	Massacre of Bosniak and Croat civilians by VRS forces.
Brčko bridge massacre	30 April 1992	Brčko	VRS	Bosniaks, Croats	c.100	Civilians killed whilst crossing the bridge over the Sava river, from Gunja, Croatia, into Brčko. The bridge was deliberately blown up, whilst civilians were crossing, by unknown Bosnian Serb soldiers. The victims were said to be of various nationalities. Some sources claim that the perpetrators may have been members of the White Eagles and Arkan's Tigers paramilitaries.
Brčko massacres	May–July 1992	Brčko	VRS	Bosniaks, Croats	500	Mass-killings and persecution of Bosniaks and Bosnian Croats by Bosnian Serb forces in the Brčko area. Most victims were detained and killed in the Luka camp.
Vlasenica massacre	May–September 1992	Vlasenica	VRS, JNA	Bosniaks	279	Bosnian Serb forces kill at least 279 Bosniaks after the takeover of Vlasenica.
Vidovice massacre	2 May 1992	Vidovice	VRS	Croats	12	Bosnian Serb forces killed 12 Croat civilians.
Laništa and Ulice massacre	8 May 1992	Laništa and Ulice, near Brčko	VRS	Croats	32	Bosnian Serb forces kill 32 Bosnian Croats.
Suha massacre	10 May 1992	Suha	VRS	Bosniaks	38	Bosnian Serbs forces attack and destroy the village of Suha, killing 38 unarmed Bosniak residents.
Liješće massacre	11 May 1992	Liješće, Brod	HVO	Serbs	17	Bosnian Croat forces killed 17 Bosnian Serbs.
Zaklopača massacre	16 May 1992	Zaklopača, near Milići	VRS	Bosniaks	63 - 83	Bosnian Serb forces kill Bosniaks.
Nova Kasaba massacre	17 May 1992	Nova Kasaba	VRS	Bosniaks	29	Bosnian Serb forces killed 29 Bosniak men and boys.
Bradina massacre	25–27 May 1992	Bradina	ARBiH, HVO	Serbs	48	Bosniak and Croat forces kill 48 Serb civilians during an attack on the Serbian village of Bradina.
Ferhadija street massacre	27 May 1992	Sarajevo	VRS (unconfirmed)	Bosniaks, Croats	26	VRS mortar attack on Ferhadija street in Sarajevo killed 26 civilians who were waiting in line to buy bread, and wounded another 108 civilians.
Čemerno massacre	10 June 1992	Čemerno, Ilijaš	ARBiH	Serbs	29–32	ARBiH kill 21 captured VRS soldiers and 9 Serb civilians.
Prijedor ethnic cleansing	1992–1995	Prijedor	VRS	Bosniaks, Croats	3,176, among them 102 children.	Bosnian Serb political and military campaign of ethnic cleansing in the Prijedor area, including massacres of civilians during offensives, and killings of prisoners in concentration camps and other detention facilities. 3,176 non-Serb civilians, mostly Bosniaks (but also Croats and others), were killed. Among the victims were 102 children and 256 women. More than 30,000 non-Serbs were detained in at least one of the concentration camps Trnopolje, Omarska and Keraterm. The largest mass grave found in Northern Bosnia to date is that of Tomasica where at least 360 bodies of non-Serb civilian casualties were buried.
Zvornik massacre	1992–1995	Zvornik	VRS	Bosniaks	838 killed or missing	Mass murder and violence committed against Bosniaks and other non-Serb civilians by Serb paramilitary groups.
Snagovo massacre	29 April 1992	Snagovo	VRS	Bosniaks	36	Serb forces capture and kill 36 Bosniak civilians who were hiding in the woods. The corpses were burned in an effort to conceal the crime.
Višegrad massacres	April–August 1992	Višegrad	VRS, JNA	Bosniaks	1000–3000	JNA and Serb-led paramilitaries killed an unverified number of Bosniak civilians thought to be around 3000. Also the site of the Vilina Vlas rape camp. Currently the subject of attempts to cover up crimes committed during the war by the government of the Republika Srpska.
Crkvina massacre	6 May 1992	Crkvina, near Odžak	VRS	Bosniaks, Croats	16	Bosnian Serb forces kill 16 Bosniaks and Croats.
Tišina massacre	7 May 1992	Tišina, Novo Selo, Tursinovac, Gornji Hasić and Donji Hasić, near Šamac	VRS	Croats	45	Bosnian Serb forces kill 45 Bosnian Croats across the Šamac municipality.
Glogova massacre	9 May 1992	Glogova, Bratunac	VRS	Bosniaks	64	Bosnian Serb forces kill 64 Bosniak civilians.
Bosanska Jagodina massacre	26 May 1992	Bosanska Jagodina	VRS	Bosniaks	17	Perpetrated by Serb paramilitary White Eagles members. The victims were Bosniaks.
Zijemlje massacre	June 1992	Zijemlje, near Mostar	VRS	Bosniaks	c.100	Bosnian Serb forces kill around 100 Bosniak civilians.
Bijeli Potok massacre	1 June 1992	Bijeli Potok	VRS	Bosniaks	675	Serb forces killed 675 Bosnian Muslim men and boys within a week at Bijeli Potok and hid their bodies in mass graves throughout the Drina Valley.
Prhovo massacre	1 June 1992	Prhovo	VRS	Bosniaks	53	VRS forces killed 53 Bosniak civilians.
Uborak massacre	13 June 1992	Uborak landfill, Mostar	VRS, JNA	Bosniaks, Croats	114	JNA and Serb Paramilitary units kill 114 non-Serb civilians (85 Bosniaks and 29 Croats) at a landfill site near Mostar.
Ahatovići massacre	14 June 1992	Ahatovići	VRS	Bosniaks	47	Bosnian Serb forces kill 47 captured Bosniak soldiers.
Pionirska Street fire	14 June 1992	Višegrad	VRS	Bosniaks	59	Perpetrated by Serb paramilitary White Eagles members. The victims were Bosniak civilians.
Paklenik massacre	15 June 1992	Rogatica	VRS	Bosniaks	48	Perpetrated by VRS members.
Kotor Varoš massacre	25 June–3 November 1992	Kotor Varoš	VRS	Bosniaks, Croats	165+	Bosniak and Croat civilians killed by Bosnian Serb forces and White Eagles paramilitaries during and after the Serb take over of Kotor Varoš and surrounding areas.
Bikavac fire	27 June 1992	Bikavac near Višegrad	VRS	Bosniaks	60	Perpetrated by Serb paramilitary White Eagles members. The victims were Bosniak civilians.
Gornji Velešići massacre	8 July 1992	Gornji Velešići, Sarajevo	ARBiH	Serbs	6	Unknown militants, most likely Bosniaks, massacred a Serb family.
Betornika convoy massacre	7 July 1992	near Manjača	VRS	Bosniaks	26	26 Bosniak prisoners, travelling from Betonirka (Sanski Most) to the Manjača camp, were killed by Bosnian Serb forces. The prisoners either suffocated because of the conditions during the transport or were executed when the sick and faint prisoners were turned away by the commander of the camp.
Biljani massacre	10 July 1992	Biljani, near Ključ	VRS	Bosniaks	250+	Bosniak civilians killed by Bosnian Serb forces.
Zalužje massacre	12 July 1992	Zalužje	ARBiH	Serbs	69	69 surrendered VRS soldiers and Serb civilians, killed by Bosniak soldiers of Naser Orić.
Musala massacre	15 July 1992	Musala, "Mladost" hall, near Konjic	ARBiH	Serbs	13	13 Serb civilians, concentration camp prisoners, killed by Bosniak soldiers.
Gornji Svilaj massacre	16 July 1992	Gornji Svilaj, near Odžak	VRS	Croats	7	Bosnian Serbs killed 7 elderly Bosnian Croat civilians in a church.
Barimo massacre	2 August 1992	Barimo	VRS	Bosniaks	26	Serb paramilitary kill 26 Bosniaks.
Odžak massacre	7 August 1992	Odžak municipality	VRS	Croats	78	Bosnian Serb forces killed 78 Croat civilians and HVO prisoners in Odžak and surrounding areas in the Odžak municipality.
Grebnica massacre	19 August 1992	Grebnica, near Šamac	VRS	Croats	11	Bosnian Serb forces kill 11 Bosnian Croats captured in Šamac.
Korićani Cliffs massacre	21 August 1992	Mount Vlašić	VRS	Bosniaks, Croats	200+	Bosnian Serb police units kill more than 200 Bosniaks, Croats and other non-Serb civilians.
Kukavice massacre	27 August 1992	Kukavice, near Rogatica	ARBiH	Serbs	21	Bosniak forces kill 21 Bosnian Serbs.
Mičivode massacre	20 September 1992	Mičivode, near Sokolac	VRS	Bosniaks	42	42 Bosniak civilians were killed by Bosnian Serb forces.
Novoseoci massacre	22 September 1992	Novoseoci, near Sokolac	VRS	Bosniaks	45	45 Bosniak civilians were killed by Bosnian Serb forces.
Serdari massacre	17 September 1992	Kotor Varoš	ARBiH	Serbs	16	16 Serb civilians killed in the village of Serdari by ArBiH members
Sjeverin massacre	22 October 1992	Višegrad	VRS	Bosniaks	16	16 Bosniak citizens of Serbia from the village of Sjeverin abducted from a Serbian bus in the village of Mioče, on Bosnian territory. The abductees were taken to the Vilina Vlas hotel in Višegrad where they were tortured before being taken to the Drina River and executed.
Prozor ethnic cleansing	1992–1994	Prozor	HVO	Bosniaks	254	Joint criminal enterprise of the Croatian Defence Council (HVO) and its political leadership in Prozor to ethnically cleanse the Bosniak population in Prozor.
Grabovica massacre (1992)	November 1992	Grabovica, near Kotor Varoš	VRS	Bosniaks	150	150 Bosniak civilians killed by Bosnian Serb forces.
Bjelovac massacre	December 1992	Bjelovac	ARBiH	Serbs	109	Serb civilians killed by ARBiH forces.
Gornja Jošanica massacre	19 December 1992	Foča	ARBiH	Serbs	56	56 Serb civilians were killed during an attack by the Army of the Republic of Bosnia and Herzegovina.
Bugojno ethnic cleansing	1993–1994	Bugojno	ARBiH	Croats	200	Joint criminal enterprise of the Army of the Republic of Bosnia and Herzegovina (ARBiH) and its political leadership in Bugojno to ethnically cleanse the Croat population in Bugojno.
Kravica massacre (1993)	7 January 1993	Kravica	ARBiH	Serbs	49	Army of Bosnia and Herzegovina (ARBiH) attacked Kravica on Orthodox Christmas, killing as many as 49 Bosnian Serb soldiers and civilians. 80 others were injured and property was destroyed on a large scale.
Duša massacre	15 January 1993	Duša near Gornji Vakuf	HVO	Bosniaks	10	Croatian Defence Council (HVO) artillery bombardment kills 10 Bosniak civilians.
Skelani massacre	16 January 1993	Skelani near Srebrenica	ARBiH	Serbs	69	Army of Bosnia and Herzegovina (ARBiH) attacks village Skelani leaving 68 dead Serb civilians.
Kadića Strana massacre	25 January 1993	Kadića Strana	HVO	Bosniaks	43	Bosnian Croats kill 43 Bosniak civilians.
Dusina massacre	26 January 1993	Dusina	ARBiH	Croats	10	Bosnian Croat civilians and HVO POWs killed by ARBiH forces.
Štrpci massacre	27 February 1993	Priboj	VRS	Bosniaks	20	Massacre of 20 people (18 Bosniaks) taken from a Belgrade-Bar train at Štrpci station near Višegrad, on Bosnian territory.
Sušanj massacre	5 April 1993	Sušanj, Zenica	ARBiH	Croats	17	ARBiH kill 17 Croat civilians in the village of Sušanj.
Srebrenica shelling	12 April 1993	Srebrenica	VRS	Bosniaks	56	VRS shells Srebrenica, with 56 dead, including children, and 73 seriously wounded.
Trusina massacre	16 April 1993	Trusina	ARBiH	Croats	22	ARBiH kills 22 Bosnian Croats.
Ahmići massacre	16 April 1993	Ahmići	HVO	Bosniaks	116–120	Bosnian Croats kill 116 Bosniak civilians.
Sovići and Doljani massacres	17 April 1993	Doljani and Sovići	HVO	Bosniaks	18	Bosnian Croat forces kill a number of Bosniaks in the villages of Doljani and Sovići.
Stari Vitez explosion	18 April 1993	Vitez	HVO	Bosniaks	6	Croatian Defence Council sent a tanker filled with 3.5 tons of explosives in Stari Vitez, killing 4 Bosniak civilians and wounding over 50.
Zenica massacre	19 April 1993	Zenica	HVO	Bosniaks	16	Several grenades shot from HVO's positions located in Putićevo village killed 16 and injured over 50 civilians in the very center of the city.
Miletići massacre	24 April 1993	Travnik	ARBiH	Croats	4	Bosnian Mujahideen kills 4 Croats.
Vranica massacre	10 May 1993	Vranica	HVO	Bosniaks	13	HVO forces killed 13 Bosniak POWs.
Dobrinja mortar attack	1 June 1993	Dobrinja, Sarajevo	VRS	Bosniaks	13	VRS mortar attack on a football pitch killed 13 civilians and wounded 133 civilians.
Tuzla rescue convoy	4 June 1993	Rakovići	HVO	Bosniaks	11	It was an attack by Croats on Bosniak aid convoy going to Tuzla, 11 Bosniak drivers were killed.
Bikoši massacre	8 June 1993	Bikoši, near Travnik	ARBiH	Croats	36	Bosnian mujahideen forces kill 36 Croats.
Čukle and Krpeljići massacre	8 June 1993	Čukle and Krpeljići near Travnik	ARBiH	Croats	28	ARBiH forces kill 21 Croats in Čukle and another 7 Croats in Krpeljići.
Vitez massacre (1993)	10 June 1993	Vitez	ARBiH	Croats	8	ARBiH shelling of a playground in Vitez killed eight Croat children.
Kiseljak massacre	12–16 June 1993	Han Ploče, Tulica and Grahovici	HVO	Bosniaks	78	Bosnian Croat forces kill 78 Bosniaks in the villages of Han Ploče, Tulica and Grahovici.
Kakanj massacre	13 June 1993	Kakanj	ARBiH	Croats	22	Croat civilians killed by ARBiH forces.
Busovača convoy massacre	16 June 1993	Busovača	ARBiH	Croats	22	ARBiH forces attacked a humanitarian aid convoy, killing 22 Croats, including 14 civilians.
Orašlje massacre	13 July 1993	Stolac	HVO	Bosniaks	15	Bosnian Croat forces kill 15 Bosniak civilians in Orašlje.
Bivolje hill killings	16 July 1993	Čaplinja	HVO	Bosniaks	12	Bosnian Croat forces kill 12 Bosniak civilians.
Vrbanja massacre	17–28 July 1993	Vrbanja	HVO	Bosniaks	45	Bosnian Croat forces kill 45 Bosniak civilians in Vrbanja.
Doljani killings	28 July 1993	Doljani	ARBiH	Croats	39	ARBiH forces killed 39 Croats in Doljani.
Crni vrh massacre	31 July 1993	Prozor	HVO	Bosniaks	23	Bosnian Croat forces used Bosniak civilians as human shield against ARBiH, 23 Bosniaks were killed on Crni Vrh.
Mokronoge massacre	10 August 1993	Mokronoge, near Tomislavgrad	HVO	Bosniaks	9	Bosnian Croats kill 9 Bosniaks in Mokronoge.
Kiseljak killings	16 August 1993	Kiseljak	ARBiH	Croats	15–43	Croat civilians were killed by ARBiH forces.
Raštani massacre	24 August 1993	Raštani	HVO	Bosniaks	31	HVO kill 31 Bosniaks in Raštani on 24 August
Grabovica massacre	8 and 9 September 1993	Grabovica	ARBiH	Croats	13-33	The ICTY Trial Chamber found that it has been established beyond reasonable doubt that 13 Croats had been killed by ARBiH forces. Other sources cite a death toll of 33 killed.
Uzdol massacre	14 September 1993	Uzdol	ARBiH	Croats	25-30	ARBiH forces killed at least 25 Croat civilians.
Stupni Do massacre	23 October 1993	Stupni Do	HVO	Bosniaks	37–44	Croatian Defence Council (HVO) kills 37–44 Bosniak civilians.
Vareš massacre	30 October 1993	Vareš	ARBiH	Croats	17	During the capture of Vareš, ARBiH killed 17 Croat civilians in the town.
Križančevo selo massacre	22 December 1993	Vitez	ARBiH	Croats	14-74	ARBiH kills Croats.
Buhine Kuće massacre	9 January 1994	near Vitez	ARBiH	Croats	26	ARBiH kills 26 Croats
Here massacre	24 January 1994	Here	HVO	Bosniaks	36	Colonel Skender of Croatian Defence Council (HVO) said said 19 men and 2 women died on the Bosnian side.
First Markale massacre	5 February 1994	Sarajevo	VRS	Bosniaks	68	VRS mortar attack on the Markale marketplace in Sarajevo killed 68 civilians and wounded 144 civilians.
Tuzla massacre	25 May 1995	Tuzla	VRS	Bosniaks	71	VRS shell the Kapija neighbourhood, killing 71 and wounding 240 civilians.
Srebrenica massacre	11–22 July 1995	Srebrenica	VRS	Bosniaks	8,373	The Preliminary List of People Missing or Killed in Srebrenica compiled by the Bosnian Federal Commission of Missing Persons contains 8,373 names. While the overwhelming majority of them were men, some 500 were under 18, and victims include several dozen women and girls. As of July 2011, 6,598 victims have been identified through DNA analysis of body parts recovered from mass graves and 5,138 victims have been buried at the Memorial Centre of Potočari.
Bosanski Petrovac air attack	August 7, 1995	Bosanski Petrovac	HVO	Serbs	9	Croat fighter-jets bomb Serb refugee column fleeing from Krajina.
Second Markale massacre	28 August 1995	Sarajevo	VRS	Bosniaks	43	A second VRS mortar attack on the Markale marketplace killed 43 civilians and wounded 75 civilians.
NATO bombing of Republika Srpska	30 August — 20 September 1995	Republika Srpska	NATO	Serbs	7-152 (direct deaths)	Operation Deliberate Force was a sustained air campaign conducted by NATO, in concert with ground operations, to undermine the military capability of the Army of Republika Srpska. Ratko Mladić claimed that the bombing killed 152 Serb civilians and wounded 273 others. However, these numbers are unconfirmed. Serbian pathologists have also alleged that the use of depleted uranium in the bombing contributed to hundreds of cancer deaths.
Vozuća massacre	September 1995	Vozuća	ARBiH	Serbs	50	Having captured town, Mujahideen and Bosniaks committed a number of crimes on the Serb population.
Bravnice massacre	September 13, 1995	Bravnice	HVO	Serbs	32	Having captured the city of Jajce, Croatian soldiers massacred 32 Serb refugees, including women and children.
Oborci massacre	13 September 1995	Oborci, near Donji Vakuf	VRS	Bosniaks, Croats	28	VRS forces massacre 24 Bosniaks and 4 Croats abducted from Mrkonjić Grad.
Trnova massacre	20 September 1995	Trnova	VRS	Bosniaks	11	Serbian Volunteer Guard paramilitaries killed 11 Bosniak civilians.
Sasina massacre	21 September 1995	Sasina	VRS	Bosniaks, Croats	65	Serbian Volunteer Guard paramilitaries killed 65 Bosniak and Croat civilians.
Mrkonjić Grad	October 1995	Mrkonjić Grad	ARBiH, HVO	Serbs	181	Having captured the town, Croats and Bosniaks committed a number of crimes on the Serb population.
