= List of massacres of Bosniaks =

This is a list of massacres of Bosnian Muslims.

== Bosnian War (1992-1995) ==
Name	Date	Location	Perpetrators	Victims (highest estimate)
Bosnian genocide	1992-1995	Republic of Bosnia and Herzegovina	Army of Republika Srpska (VRS), Yugoslav People's Army (JNA), Scorpions paramilitary group	c. 34,000
Sanski Most ethnic cleansing	1992-1995	Sanski Most	VRS	842
Doboj ethnic cleansing (1992)	April–October 1992	Doboj	VRS	322
Bijeljina massacre	1-2 April 1992	Bijeljina	VRS, JNA	78
Foča ethnic cleansing	7 April 1992-January 1994	Foča	(Socialist Federal Republic of Yugoslavia) (Republika Srpska (1992–1995)) Serb forces	2,707
Snagovo massacre	29 April 1992	Snagovo	(Socialist Federal Republic of Yugoslavia) (Republika Srpska (1992–1995)) Serb forces	36
Prijedor ethnic cleansing	30 April 1992–1993	Prijedor	VRS	3,515
Vlasenica	May–September 1992	Vlasenica	VRS, JNA	279
Glogova massacre	9 May 1992	Glogova	VRS, JNA	64
Suha massacre	10 May 1992	Suha	VRS	38
Zaklopača massacre	16 May 1992	Zaklopača and Milići	VRS, JNA	83
Nova Kasaba massacre	17 May 1992	Nova Kasaba	(Republika Srpska (1992–1995)) Serb forces including White Eagles	29
Zvornik massacre	April–July 1992	Zvornik	(Socialist Federal Republic of Yugoslavia) (Republika Srpska (1992–1995)) Serb forces	700 (includes some Romani civilians)
Višegrad massacres	April–August 1992	Višegrad	VRS, JNA	3,000
Bosanska Jagodina massacre	26 May 1992	Crnčići	Yellow Wasps, VRS	17
Zijemlje massacre	June 1992	Zijemlje	(Republika Srpska (1992–1995)) Serb forces	100
Bijeli Potok massacre	1 June 1992	Bijeli Potok	Yellow Wasps, VRS	675
Ahatovići massacre	14 June 1992	Ahatovići (Novi Grad Sarajevo)	VRS	47
Pionirska Street fire	14 June 1992	Višegrad	VRS, White Eagles	59; victims were women and children locked in a house and burned alive
Paklenik massacre	15 June 1992	Rogatica	VRS	50
Bikavac fire	27 June 1992	Bikavac	VRS	60; victims were mostly women and children, burned alive in their homes by Serb troops
Biljani massacre	10 July 1992	Biljani	Serb forces	~260
Barimo massacre	2 August 1992	Barimo, Višegrad	VRS	26; village burnt down, Islamic religious buildings destroyed
Kramer Selo massacre	2 August 1992	Kramer Selo and Han Stjenica, Rogatica municipality	VRS	36
Korićani Cliffs massacre	21 August 1992	Korićanske stijene	Police of Republika Srpska	224 (including other non-Serbs)
Mičivode massacre	20 September 1992	Mičivode	VRS	42
Novoseoci massacre	22 September 1992	Novoseoci	VRS	45; local mosque destroyed, many women raped
Sjeverin massacre	22 October 1992	Sjeverin	White Eagles	16
Grabovica massacre	November 1992	Grabovica, Kotor Varoš	VRS	150
Duša killings	7 January 1993	Duša	Croatian Defence Council (HVO)	7; Muslim homes burnt down following HVO takeover of the village
Ahmići massacre	16 April 1993	Ahmići	HVO	120; nearly all Muslim homes burned down, several Islamic religious buildings destroyed, 2 mosques mined deliberately and 1 destroyed with explosives laid at the base of its minaret
Sovići and Doljani killings	17 April 1993	Sovići and Doljani	HVO, (Croatian Republic of Herzeg-Bosnia) Croatian Army (HV)	18; Muslim homes and mosques burned down
Zenica massacre	19 April 1993	Zenica	HVO	16
Kiseljak massacre	12-16 June 1993	Kiseljak	HVO	78
Vrbanja massacre	17-28 July 1993	Vrbanja (Bugojno)	HVO	45
Mokronoge massacre	10 August 1993	Mokronoge, near Tomislavgrad	HVO	9
Stupni Do massacre	23 October 1993	Stupni Do	HVO	37; several Muslim women raped, children and men beaten, robbed of every possession, some burned alive
Markale massacres	5 February 1994	Sarajevo	VRS	68
Tuzla massacre	25 May 1995	Tuzla	VRS	71
Srebrenica massacre	11-31 July 1995	Srebrenica	VRS, Scorpions	8,372; only massacre in Europe recognized as genocide since the Second World War
Trnova massacre	20 September 1995	Trnova, Sanski Most	Serb Volunteer Guard	11

== Second World War (1941-1945) ==
Name	Date	Location	Perpetrators	Victims (highest estimate)
Genocide of Bosniaks during World War II	1941-1945	Kingdom of Yugoslavia	Chetniks, (Kingdom of Italy) fascist Italy(1941-1943)	100,000
Artovac massacre	28 June 1941	Avtovac	Chetniks	47
Drvar massacre	27 July 1941	Drvar	Chetniks, Yugoslav Partisans	200
Višegrad massacres (1941)	July–August 1941	Višegrad	Serb villagers	500
Berkovići massacre	26-28 August 1941	Berkovići	Chetniks	300
Zaklopača massacre	August 1941	Srebrenica	Chetniks	81
Plana massacre	3 September 1941	Plana	Chetniks	425
Kulen Vakuf massacre	6-8 September 1941	Kulen Vakuf	Chetniks, Yugoslav Partisans	c. 3,000 (captured soldiers and civilians)
Rogatica massacre	October 1941-January 1942	Rogatica	Chetniks	2,000
Prača massacre	Mid November 1941	Prača	Chetniks	63
Koraj massacre	28 November 1941	Koraj, near Brčko	Chetniks	100+
Čajniče massacre	December 1941	Čajniče	Chetniks	418
Divin massacre	December 1941	Divin	Chetniks	423
Sopotnik massacre	December 1941	Sopotnik, near Zvornik	Chetniks	86
Foča massacre (1941)	5 December 1941–January 1942	Foča	Chetniks, aided by (Kingdom of Italy) Royal Italian Army	2,000
Goražde massacre	30 December 1941 – 26 January 1942	Goražde	Chetniks	2,050
Žepa massacre	late 1941	Žepa	Chetniks	c. 300
Čelebić massacre	January 1942	Čelebić	Chetniks	54
Srebrenica massacre (1942)	January 1942	Srebrenica and surrounding areas	Chetniks	c. 1,000
Višegrad massacre (1942)	January 1942	Višegrad	Chetniks	1,000+
Drakan massacre	3 March 1942	Drakan	Chetniks	42
Resnik massacre	5 March 1942	Resnik	Chetniks	51
Foča massacre (1942)	August 1942	Foča	Chetniks	c. 3,000
Ustikolina massacre	August 1942	Ustikolina	Chetniks	2,500
Bijelo Polje massacres	January 1943	Bijelo Polje	Chetniks	c. 1,000
Massacres in Pljevlja, Priboj, Čajniče and Foča	January–February 1943	Pljevlja, Priboj, Čajniče, Foča districts and surrounding villages	Chetniks	c. 9,200
Bukovica massacre	4-7 February 1943	Bukovica, Pljevlja	Chetniks	576+
Kasidoli massacre	February 5, 1943	Kasidoli, Priboj	Chetniks	227
Goražde massacre (1943)	March 1943	Goražde	Chetniks	500
Višegrad massacre (1943)	5 October 1943	Višegrad	Chetniks	2,000+
Goažde massacre (1944)	May 1944	Goražde	Chetniks	c. 50

== Other ==
Name	Date	Location	Perpetrators	Victims (highest estimate)
Šahovići massacre	9-10 November 1924	Šahovići	Orthodox Christian mob	900

== Sources ==
- Tomasevich, Jozo (1975). War and Revolution in Yugoslavia, 1941–1945: The Chetniks. Stanford: Stanford University Press. ISBN 978-0-8047-0857-9.
- Tomasevich, Jozo (2001). War and Revolution in Yugoslavia, 1941–1945: Occupation and Collaboration. Vol. 2. San Francisco: Stanford University Press. ISBN 978-0-8047-3615-2.
- Čekić, Smail (1996). Genocid nad Bošnjacima u Drugom svjetskom ratu: dokumenti [Genocide of Bosniaks in World War II: documents] (PDF). Udruženje Muslimana za antigenocidne aktivnosti. Archived (PDF) from the original on 15 October 2020.
- Hoare, Marko Attila (2006). Genocide and resistance in Hitler's Bosnia: the Partisans and the Chetniks, 1941-1943. A British Academy postdoctoral fellowship monograph. Oxford; New York: Oxford University Press. ISBN 978-0-19-726380-8. OCLC 80016969.
- Hoare, Marko Attila (2013). Bosnian Muslims in the Second World War. Oxford University Press. ISBN 978-0-231-70394-9.
- Mojzes, Paul (2011). Balkan Genocides: Holocaust and Ethnic Cleansing in the 20th Century. Rowman & Littlefield. ISBN 9781442206632.
