= Timeline of the Croat–Bosniak War =

Listing of important events

The Croat–Bosniak War was a conflict between the Republic of Bosnia and Herzegovina and the Croatian Community of Herzeg-Bosnia, supported by Croatia, that lasted from 19 June 1992 – 23 February 1994. The Croat-Bosniak War is often referred to as a "war within a war" because it was part of the larger Bosnian War.

== 1991 ==
=== March ===
- March 1991: Milošević–Tuđman Karađorđevo meeting – Franjo Tuđman and Slobodan Milošević met and purportedly discussed the partition of Bosnia and Herzegovina between Croatia and Serbia.

=== November ===
- 12 November 1991: Croatian political leaders in Bosnia and Herzegovina, Mate Boban and Dario Kordić signed a document about a common Croatian state: "the Croatian people in Bosnia and Herzegovina must finally embrace a determined and active policy which will realise our eternal dream – a common Croatian state".
- 18 November 1991: The Croatian Democratic Union (HDZ) party branch in Bosnia and Herzegovina, proclaimed the existence of the Croatian Community of Herzeg-Bosnia, as a separate "political, cultural, economic and territorial whole," on the territory of Bosnia and Herzegovina.

== 1992 ==
=== April ===
- 8 April 1992: The Croatian Defence Council (Hrvatsko vijeće obrane, HVO) was established in Grude as the official military formation of the Croatian Community of Herzeg-Bosnia.
- 10 April 1992: Mate Boban decreed that the Bosnian Territorial Defence (TO), which had been created the day before, was illegal on territory of the Croatian Community of Herzeg-Bosnia.
- 15 April 1992: The Army of Republic of Bosnia and Herzegovina (Armija Republike Bosne i Hercegovine, ARBiH) was established by the Bosnian leadership.
- 21 April 1992: Croatian Crisis Staff took over the powers of the Kiseljak Municipal Assembly, although under the constitution of Bosnia and Herzegovina, only the Municipal Assembly is entitled to exercise those powers, which led to many discriminatory measures against the Bosnian Muslim authorities and population in Kiseljak.

=== May ===
- 6 May 1992: The Graz agreement between Bosnian Serb leader Radovan Karadžić and Bosnian Croat leader Mate Boban. It was meant to stop the conflict between Serb and Croat forces. The two sides ultimately parted ways, without signing any agreement.
- 9 May 1992: Blaž Kraljević, commander of the Croatian Defence Forces (HOS) armed group in Herzegovina, publicly opposed the Graz agreement and stood up to the Croat leadership in Bosnia and Herzegovina.
- 10 May 1992: Croats issued an ultimatum to all Bosnian military units in Busovača calling on them to surrender their weapons and to place themselves under Croat command.
- 11 May 1992: Tihomir Blaškić declared the Bosnian Territorial Defence (TO) illegal on the territory of the Kiseljak municipality.
- 22 May 1992: Bosnian state organs in the Busovača municipality were abolished. Bosniaks were forced to sign an act of allegiance to the Croat authorities, fell victim to numerous attacks on shops and businesses and, gradually, left the area out of fear that they would be the victims of mass crimes.

=== June ===
- June 1992: Croat military formations took over the headquarters in Vitez and the Municipal Assembly building and raised the flags of Herzeg-Bosnia and of Croatia.
- 15 June 1992: Croatian Crisis Staff imposed the Croatian dinar "on the territory of the Kiseljak municipality as the currency of account" and ordered that "all commercial service companies [were] obliged to display the prices of products and services in Croatian dinars".
- 19 June 1992: Short armed confrontation between the ARBiH and HVO occurred in Novi Travnik.

=== July ===
- 1 July 1992: The Croatian Defence Council (HVO) took over all civilian and military power in Vareš and prohibited all Territorial Defence (TO) activities.
- 3 July 1992: The Croatian Community of Herzeg-Bosnia was formally declared in an amendment to the original decision from November 1991.
- 21 July 1992: The Agreement on Friendship and Cooperation between Bosnia and Herzegovina and Croatia was signed by Alija Izetbegović and Franjo Tuđman.

=== August ===
- August 1992: The HVO launched attacks on the villages of Duhri, Potkraj, Radanovići and Topole in the municipality of Kiseljak, which involved more violent incidents, including setting fire to homes where Bosnian Muslims lived and vandalising their businesses.
- 9 August 1992: HOS Commander Blaž Kraljević was killed at a checkpoint in the village of Kruševo by the HVO.
- 23 August 1992: HVO and HOS leaders in Herzegovina agreed to incorporate the HOS into the HVO.
- August 1992: In Travnik, Dario Kordić and Ignac Koštroman addressed Croat troops with the message that those who do not wish to live in the Croatian provinces of Herzeg-Bosnia are all enemies and must be fought with both political and military means.
- August 1992: In Vitez, the gist of Kordić's speech was a statement to the Muslims of the Lašva Valley that this was Croat land and that they had to accept it.

=== September ===
- 5 September 1992: Presidency of the Croatian Democratic Union (HDZ) in Travnik stated that the Croats in the municipality refused unitary State of Bosnia and Herzegovina and accepted only the HVO government.
- 7 September 1992: On 7 September, HVO demanded that the Bosniak militiamen withdraw from Croatian suburbs of Stup, Bare, Azići, Otes, Dogladi and parts of Nedzarici in Sarajevo and issued an ultimatum.
- 18 September 1992: Decrees relating to the Croatian Community of Herzeg-Bosnia (including that to establish it on 18 November 1991) were annulled by the Bosnia and Herzegovina Constitutional Court.
- 30 September 1992: Croat leadership in Kakanj municipality met with Dario Kordić, as vice-president of Herzeg-Bosnia, who stated that they would not take Kakanj by force but it would be given to them because Muslims were losing morale and they wouldn't be strong enough to confront realisation of the Croatian political platform.
- September 1992: Heliodrom camp, located in Herzegovina, established on the orders of Bruno Stojić, Minister of Defence of Herzeg-Bosnia and Valentin Ćorić, Commander of the HVO Military Police.

=== October ===
- 19 October 1992: The Croatian flag was raised on the police station in Prozor, located in the northern part of Herzegovina.
- 19–26 October 1992: The conflict between Croatian Defence Council (HVO) and Bosnian Army (ARBiH) broke out again in Novi Travnik when the HVO attacked a Bosnian Army unit in the fire brigade building. It is assumed that the cause of the conflict was a demand by the HVO to be allowed to take over the Bratstvo ammunition factory which the Bosnian Army refused.
- 19 October 1992: During the early part of the conflict in Novi Travnik, the local TO, on orders from their superiors, put up a barricade in Ahmići in the Vitez municipality on the main road through the Lašva Valley in order to prevent HVO reinforcements reaching Novi Travnik.
- 20 October 1992: Early in the morning the HVO attacked the Ahmići barricade. The houses were set on fire, the minaret of the mosque was hit and a 16-year-old boy was killed. The attack lasted all morning until the people manning the barricade ran out of ammunition and the checkpoint was then removed.
- 20 October 1992: The HVO took over Vitez police station and expelled the Bosnian Muslim police officers.
- 22 October 1992: A general cease-fire for the Vitez municipality was signed.
- 23 October 1992: Croat forces attacked Bosnian Muslims in Prozor town and started ethnic cleansing which included different forms of violence.
- 24 October 1992: Croat forces attacked Paljike, a predominantly Bosniak village approximately one kilometer south of Prozor town, deliberately destroyed houses and property, killed some of the villagers, and the next day transferred the others to the Ripci primary school where Bosnian Muslims from Prozor were detained.
- 24 October 1992: On the evening, an area HVO commander reported that Prozor town was "ethnically pure" and "the Muslim population having been detained or having fled".
- 24–25 October 1992: Shortly after Croat forces attacked Bosnian Muslims in neighbouring Prozor municipality, the HVO and Bosnian Army engaged in fighting in Gornji Vakuf town, and the HVO seized control of several factories and the Ministry of Interior building.
- 26 October 1992: Bruno Stojić, Milivoj Petković, Janko Bobetko and others were informed that the Croat forces had taken control of Prozor on 25 October, with many casualties on the Muslim side.

=== November ===
- 4 November 1992: Jajce, a town north-east of Travnik, which had been under siege by the Serb forces and which was defended by a combined Bosniak and Croat force, had fallen, releasing a flood of refugees into the area of Travnik and Zenica.

=== December ===
- December 1992: The Croat forces had taken control of the municipalities of the Lašva Valley and had only met significant opposition in Novi Travnik and Ahmići. Much of Central Bosnia therefore was in the hands of the Croat forces.

== 1993 ==
=== January ===
- 2 January 1993: The Vance–Owen peace plan was proposed in Geneva.
- 11 January 1993: Clashes between the HVO and the ARBiH started in Gornji Vakuf.
- 18 January 1993: Duša killings, 7 Bosniak civilians killed during the HVO shelling of village Duša.
- 24 January 1993: 2 HVO soldiers killed in an ambush by the ARBiH.
- 26 January 1993: The ARBiH killed 6 Croats and a Serb civilian in the village of Dusina near Zenica.

=== March ===
- 28 March 1993: Tuđman and Izetbegović sign an agreement to establish a joint Croat-Bosniak military in Bosnia and Herzegovina.

=== April ===
- Start of the Lašva Valley counteroffensive
- 13 April 1993: Four HVO soldiers were kidnapped by the mujahideen outside Novi Travnik.
- 14 April 1993: Conflict between ARBiH and HVO escalates in Konjic and Jablanica.
- 15 April 1993: The mujahideen kidnapped HVO commander Živko Totić in Zenica and killed his escort. A joint ARBiH-HVO commission was formed to investigate the case.
- 15–17 April 1993: Battle of Sovići and Doljani, HVO victory.
- 16 April 1993: Ahmići massacre, HVO troops killed at least 103 Bosniak civilians.
- 16 April 1993: Trusina killings, ARBiH troops killed 18 Croat civilians and 4 POWs in the village of Trusina.
- 19 April 1993: ARBiH defeats HVO in Zenica.
- HVO attacks Muslim population of Gaćice, Pirići, Preočica and Novi Vitez. ARBiH counteroffensive succeeds in rolling back some HVO gains and recapturing all checkpoints.
- 24 April 1993: Four Croat civilians killed by the Mujahideen upon taking the village of Miletići near Travnik.

=== May ===
- 6 May 1993: Bosnian Serbs reject the Vance–Owen plan on a referendum.
- 9 May 1993: Fierce fighting escalates in Mostar.
- 10 May 1993: HVO captures the Vranica building in Mostar, 10 Bosniak POWs were killed.

=== June ===
- 4 June 1993: ARBiH takes Travnik; large exodus of Croats to Busovača.
- 8 June 1993: Mujahideen forces killed at least 24 Croat civilians and POWs near the village of Bikoši.
- 9 June 1993: ARBiH launched a strong offensive in Novi Travnik at 5:15 AM quickly gaining control over most of the town and its municipality.
- 10 June 1993: Eight Croat children were killed in a playground during the ARBiH shelling of Vitez.
- 10 June 1993: Convoy of Joy incident, Croat refugees and HVO soldiers block and ambush an aid convoy heading for Tuzla. Eight Bosniak drivers and two HVO soldiers were killed.
- 12 June 1993: HVO Kiseljak and the Serb forces from Ilidža in village Grahovci (between Kiseljak and Ilidža) kill 37 Bosniak civilians.
- 13 June 1993: ARBiH had taken control of Travnik and the surrounding villages.
- 16 June 1993: The ARBiH takes control over Kakanj.
- 30 June 1993: Battle of Žepče ends with HVO securing the town of Žepče, while ARBiH secures nearby Zavidovići.

=== July ===
- 2 July 1993: ARBiH attacks and captures Fojnica.
- 25 July 1993: Battle of Bugojno ends, ARBiH takes control of the city.

=== August ===
- 1 August 1993: ARBiH takes control over most of Gornji Vakuf, HVO remains in the southwestern part of the town.

=== September ===
- 7 September 1993: the Parliament of Croatia recognized Herzeg-Bosnia as a possible form of sovereignty for Croats of Bosnia and Herzegovina.
- 8–9 September 1993: Massacre in Grabovica, at least 13, and as many as 35 Croats were killed in the village of Grabovica by members of the ARBiH.
- 14 September 1993: ARBiH attacked the village of Uzdol during the Uzdol massacre in which 29 Croat civilians and one HVO prisoner were killed by the Prozor Independent Battalion.

=== October ===
- 22 October 1993: Tuđman instructed Šušak and Bobetko to continue to support Herzeg-Bosnia, believing that "the future borders of the Croatian state are being resolved there."
- 23 October 1993: Stupni Do massacre, 36 Bosniaks were killed by the HVO in the village of Stupni Do.

=== November ===
- ARBiH attacked Vareš.
- 9 November 1993: Old Bridge in Mostar was destroyed by the HVO.

=== December ===
- 22–22 December 1993: Križančevo Selo killings, dozens of Croats were killed during the attack by the Bosnian Army.

== 1994 ==
=== January ===
- 9 January 1994: Massacre in Buhine Kuće, near Vitez: Bosniak forces killed 26 Croat civilians, including 8 children.
- 24 January 1994: Operation Tvigi 94, HVO forces claimed the village of Here from the ARBiH.

=== February ===
- 23 February 1994: The Croat-Bosniak war officially ended when the Commander of HVO, general Ante Roso and commander of Bosnian Army, general Rasim Delić, signed a ceasefire agreement in Zagreb. In March 1994 a peace agreement mediated by the USA between the warring Croats (represented by Republic of Croatia) and Bosnia and Herzegovina was signed in Washington and Vienna which is known as the Washington Agreement. Under the agreement, the combined territory held by the Croat and Bosnian government forces was divided into ten autonomous cantons, establishing the Federation of Bosnia and Herzegovina.
