= Liplje, Zvornik =

Liplje Липље
- Village
- Location within Bosnia and Herzegovina
- Coordinates: 44°21′52″N 19°04′23″E
- Country: Bosnia and Herzegovina
- Municipality: Zvornik
- Time zone: UTC+1 (CET)
  - Summer (DST): UTC+2 (CEST)

Liplje is a mountain village located in the municipality of Zvornik, Bosnia and Herzegovina, neighboring Snagovo. Within Liplje there are 14 settlements: Bajrići, Bećirovići, Čamlija, Hadžići, Husići, Jašići, Jošanica, Kadrići, Korin Brijeg, Liplje, Salihovići, Samari, Sultanovići and Velja Glava.

== History ==
=== World War II ===
In July 1943, the Yugoslav Partisan-aligned 1st Proletarian Brigade, with Filip Kljajić serving as their political commissary, liberated occupied Zvornik from the Wehrmacht and the troops of the occupying Independent State of Croatia. During withdrawal Kljajić died of an accidental gunshot on a hill on the outskirts of Zvornik. His body was brought to Liplje and buried. Kljajić's body was taken in the 1960s from that spot by his family and reburied in a family plot elsewhere. A memorial was erected on the spot where his corpse was originally buried. Following the ethnic cleansing of Liplje in 1992 during the Bosnian War, the memorial suffered and became overgrown with shrubbery.

=== Bosnian War ===
==== Liplje concentration camp ====
At the start of the Bosnian War, armed Serb peasants from the nearby village of Snagovo overran Liplje on 1 May 1992 and, by 25 May, turned it into a concentration camp (see: Liplje camp) with the Bosniak (Muslim) residents becoming prisoners. Between 420 and 460 people were imprisoned; men, women and children were beaten, raped repeatedly and killed by Serbs. A total of 27 prisoners died. Escapees organized resistance groups in the towns of Cerska and Kamenica. On 1 June 1992, about 300 Bosniaks armed with 27 rifles liberated the Liplje concentration camp. It became the only camp with Bosniak prisoners to be liberated in the entirety of the 1992–95 war. None of the Serb rapists from the camp have been brought to justice.

==== Mass graves ====
In August 1998, a mass grave believed to be of victims killed in 1995, was discovered and exhumed, revealing at least 191 individuals, most of whom died of gunshot. Several mass graves were found in Liplje, with exhumations still ongoing as of 2012.

It was reported by Reuters on 8 July 2001 that a mass grave of approximately 200 victims of the 1995 Srebrenica Genocide was discovered in Liplje.

==== Post-war ====
Bosniak returnees experience discrimination from the authorities of the Zvornik municipality, which fell into the hands of Republika Srpska after the war.

The elementary school in Liplje, which taught around 400 children before the war, currently has only 20 students. Liplje is one of the stops during the annual Marš mira (March of Peace).

=== Flooding ===
Heavy rainfall in June 2010 set off several landslides and rock slides in Liplje. Due to the blockage of the flow of water, a local creek overflowed and swept away the main access road to the village. The flood also destroyed the crops of the Bosniak returnees. More flooding and landslides were reported following heavy rainfall in March 2015.

== See also ==
- Liplje camp
