= Raštani =

Raštani may refer to:

- Raštani, Mostar, Bosnia and Herzegovina
- Raštani, Bitola, North Macedonia
- Raštani, Kičevo, North Macedonia
- Raštani, Veles, North Macedonia
