= Kukavice =

Kukavice may refer to the following places:

- Kukavice, Kupres, Bosnia and Herzegovina
- Kukavice (Rogatica), Bosnia and Herzegovina
  - Kukavice massacre, 1992
- Kukavicë, Kosovo
