= Siege of Kotor Varoš =

1992 event in the Bosnian War

- Part of the Bosnian War
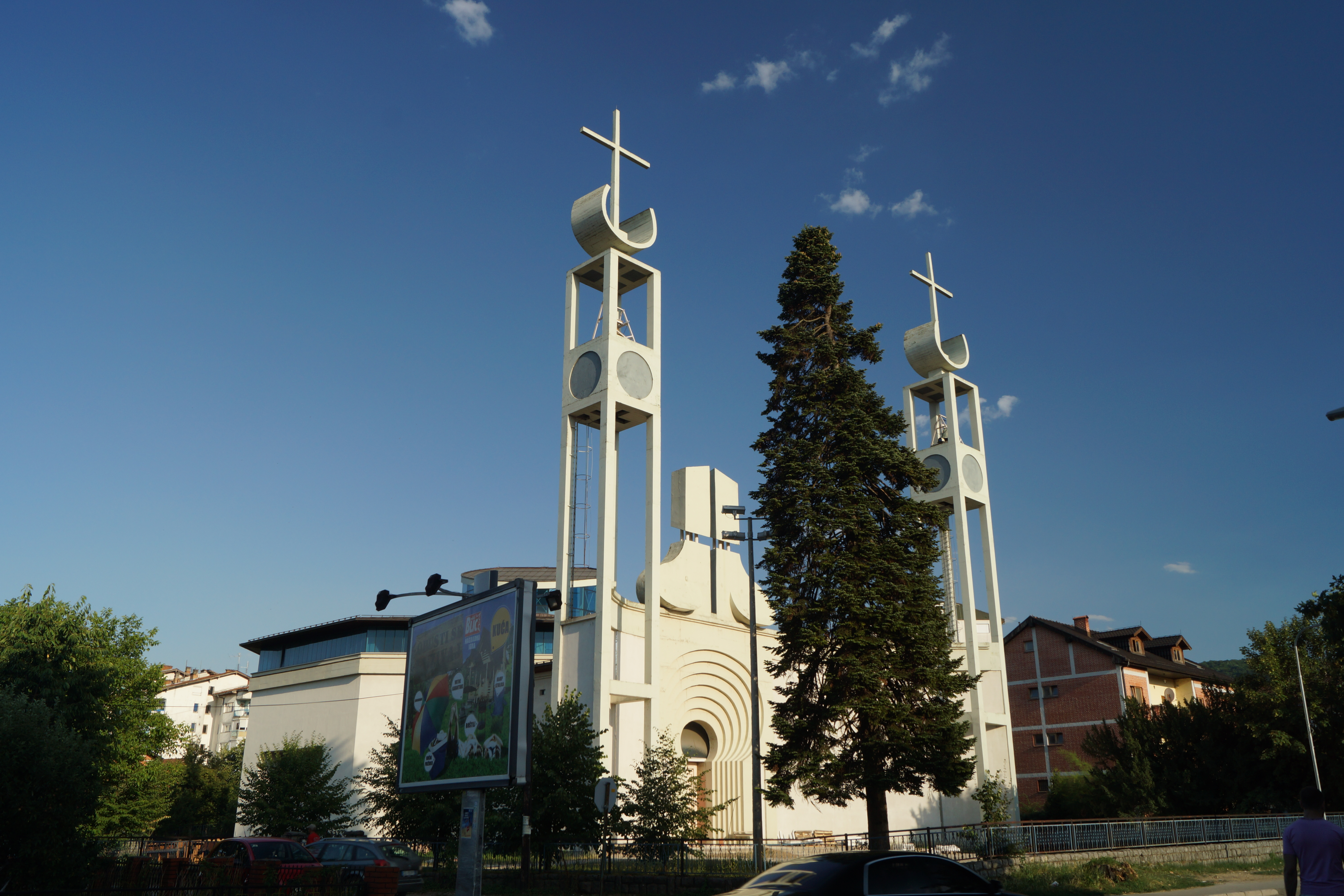
Date	11 – 25 June 1992
Location	Kotor Varoš, Bosnia and Herzegovina
Result	Army of Republika Srpska victory: Republika Srpska captures Kotor Varoš

Belligerents
Republika Srpska	Republic of Bosnia and Herzegovina (Croatian Republic of Herzeg-Bosnia) Herzeg-Bosnia

Commanders and leaders
(Republika Srpska) Slobodan Dubočanin	(Bosnia and Herzegovina) Muhamed Sadiković (Croatian Republic of Herzeg-Bosnia) Anto Mandić (POW)

Units involved
Army of Republika Srpska	Army of the Republic of Bosnia and Herzegovina; Croatian Defence Council; Croatian Defence Forces

The siege of Kotor Varoš took place during the Bosnian War and lasted from 11th to 25th June 1992. The conflict involved the Croatian Defence Council (HVO) and the Army of the Republic of Bosnia and Herzegovina on one side, against the Army of Republika Srpska (VRS), in Kotor Varoš and its villages. Kotor Varoš was surrounded by the VRS and heavy fighting took place throughout the summer of 1992, ending with the fall of the Kotor Varoš and the start of Operation Vrbas '92 to capture Jajce.

== Background ==
On 18 November, the autonomous Croatian Community of Herzeg-Bosnia (HZ-HB) was established, it claimed it had no secession goal and that it would serve a "legal basis for local self-administration". The decision on its establishment stated that the Community will "respect the democratically elected government of the Republic of Bosnia and Herzegovina for as long as exists the state independence of Bosnia and Herzegovina in relation to the former, or any other, Yugoslavia". Mate Boban was established as its president. Although the city of Kotor Varoš had slightly more Serbs than Croats, Croats were allies with Bosniaks, so they held the majority and plus, the surrounding villages had Croat and Bosniak majority. Croats considered Kotor Varoš their city and included it in the maps of Herceg-Bosnia.

Croats and Bosniaks goal was cleanse the Serbs from the municipality and to connect with government-held territory. In April, many Serbs left Kotor Varoš due to fear of TOBiH and HVO presence in the city. Serbian civilians who remained were abused, killed and robbed just like in Kupres and Sjekovac. Some of the crimes took place even after the Serbian occupation of Kotor Varoš. One of the most famous was the massacre in Serdari, committed by the ARBiH. Army of Republika Srpska aimed to eliminate all the enclaves that were in it, and one of them was Kotor Varoš.

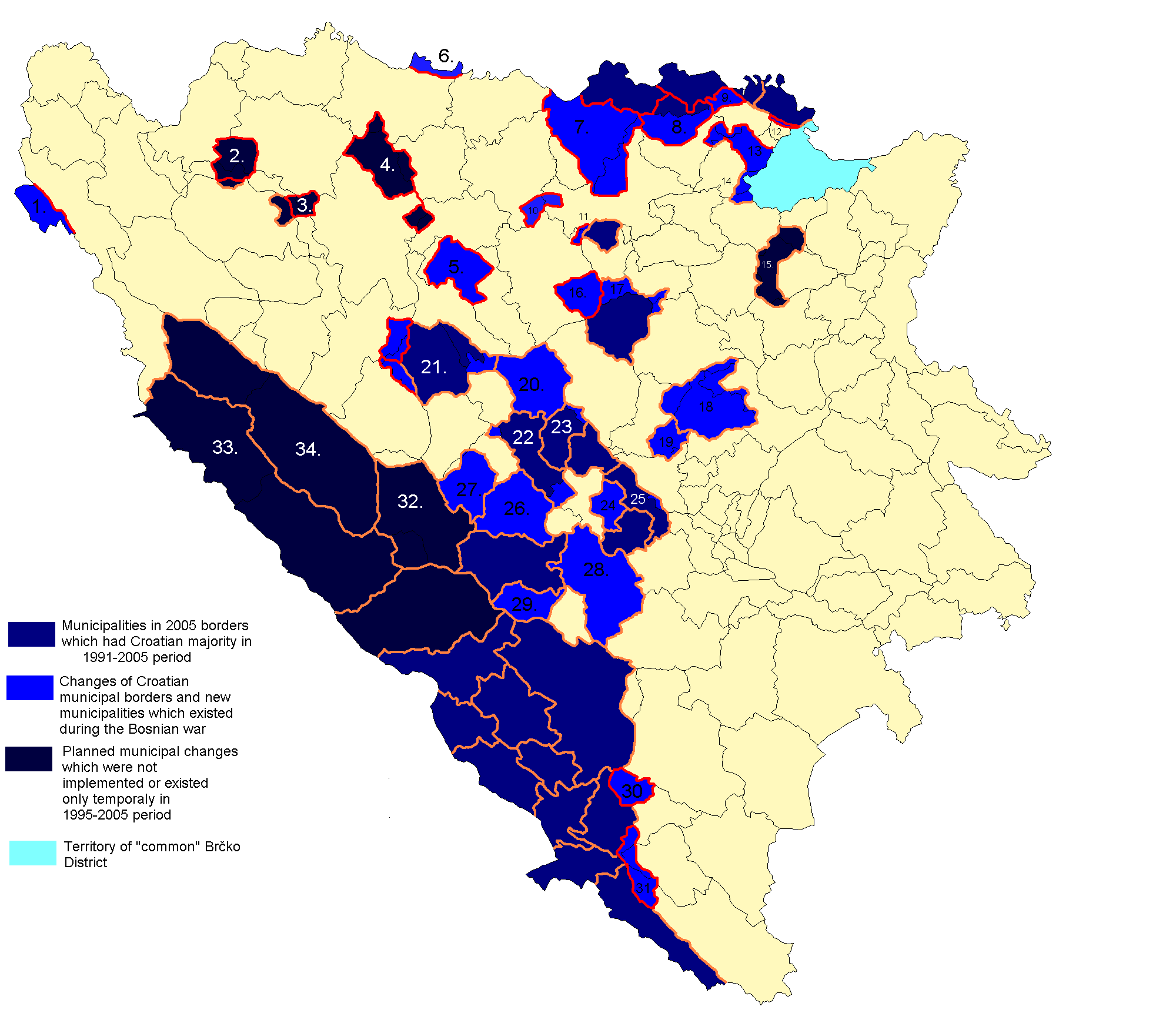
Kotor Varoš (number 5) as part of Herzeg-Bosnia

== Timeline ==
On 11 June 1992, Serbian soldiers attacked the city of Kotor Varoš, and arrested its Croat mayor, Anto Mandić. Shootings broke out in the city, VRS on one side and ARBiH and HVO on the other, the civilians were in a panic. The Serbs also shelled the city from the surrounding area. The village of Večići was attacked with heavy artillery and air raids, while Hanifići, Plitska and Kotor were attacked and set on fire. Vrbanjci were a mixed village with a majority Muslim and Croat population. On 11 June 1992, several non-Serbs from Vrbanjač were arrested and taken in the direction of Kotor Varoš. On 12 June the fighting ended and the city was occupied by the VRS. On 13 June, VRS soldiers attacked and shelled the village of Hravacani, where Muslims lived, and killed five elderly Muslims. Serbs forced many Muslims and Croats to flee into the forest. Army of Bosnian Serbs attacked the town of Kotor-Varoš and the village of Vrbanci. On 19 June Muslims and Croats surrendered their weapons and returned to the city. On June 25 in Kotor Varoš, there was a shooting between ARBiH and VRS under the command of Slobodan Dubočanin. Rebel ARBiH soldiers were killed.

== Aftermath ==
The battle resulted in significant destruction and displacement of the civilian population. Reports of atrocities and ethnic cleansing emerged, with many non-Serb residents being expelled or killed. Upon the city’s capture, Bosnian Serb authorities began an ethnic cleansing campaign against the Croat and Bosniak population. In a diverse city that once held a significant Croat population, the massacres and expulsions resulted in the near destruction of the non-Serb population.

== Sources ==
- Marijan, Davor (2004). "Expert Opinion: On the War Connections of Croatia and Bosnia and Herzegovina (1991–1995)". Journal of Contemporary History. 36: 249–289.
- Ramet, Sabrina P. (2010). "Politics in Croatia since 1990". In Ramet, Sabrina P. (ed.). Central and Southeast European Politics Since 1989. Cambridge: Cambridge University Press. pp. 258–285. ISBN 978-1-139-48750-4.
- Toal, Gerard; Dahlman, Carl T. (2011). Bosnia Remade: Ethnic Cleansing and Its Reversal. New York: Oxford University Press. ISBN 978-0-19-973036-0.
