= Glogova massacre =

1992 massacre in Bosnia and Herzegovina

- Part of Bosnian War
- Location: 44°12′36″N 19°15′36″E; Glogova, Bosnia and Herzegovina
- Date: 9 May 1992 (Central European Time)
- Target: Bosniaks
- Attack type: Mass killings
- Deaths: 64
- Perpetrators: Bosnian Serb forces, Yugoslav People's Army (JNA)

The Glogova massacre was the mass murder of 64 Bosniak civilians by Serb forces, consisting of the Yugoslav People's Army (JNA), Bratunac Territorial Defence (TO), local police, and paramilitaries from Serbia, on 9 May 1992. Miroslav Deronjić, the head of the "Bratunac Municipal Board" established by the Serbian Democratic Party (SDS), was sentenced to 10 years in prison by the International Criminal Tribunal for the former Yugoslavia for ordering the massacre.

== Background ==
Village Glogova is located in the Bratunac municipality near Srebrenica in east Bosnia and Herzegovina. In 1991, the village had 1,913 residents, including 1,901 identified as Bosnian Muslims (Bosniaks), six as Bosnian Serbs, four as Yugoslavs, one as a Bosnian Croat and one as "other".

== Massacre ==
On 9 May 1992, Serb forces, composed of the Yugoslav People's Army (JNA), Bratunac Territorial Defence, the local police, and Serbian paramilitary, entered Glogova, attacking the unarmed and defenseless village. The villagers were rounded up at the village's center and while in progress a number were killed. After being gathered, a group of about 19 Bosniak men were executed at the center. The attackers then made other Bosniaks carry and throw these and other bodies into a river. After doing so they were forced near the river and executed as well. Another group of about 20 Bosniak men were gathered at the village's market and then marched to the river and executed. A total of 64 Bosniak civilians were killed in the massacre and a number were forcibly displaced. A significant portion of Glogova was demolished including houses owned by Bosniaks, the village's mosque, and other private property.

== Trial ==
On 4 July 2002, an indictment and arrest warrant were filed against Miroslav Deronjić, the head of the SDS-established "Bratunac Municipal Board", by the International Criminal Tribunal for the former Yugoslavia (ICTY). The Stabilisation Force (SFOR) captured him shortly afterwards. On 10 July 2002, he pleaded not guilty to all charges of the first indictment. On 30 September 2003, he entered a plea deal and "accepted without any reservation full responsibility for the crimes". He was sentenced to 10 years in prison by the ICTY. The sentence was criticized by dissenting Judge Wolfgang Schomburg as inadequate for the "heinous and long-planned crimes" committed and argued that he should have received a sentence of "no less than twenty years." He also criticized the prosecution for focusing only Deronjić's involvement in Glogova which he considered a part of "a larger criminal plan." Deronjić died of natural causes on 19 May 2007.

== See also ==
- List of massacres in Bosnia and Herzegovina
- List of massacres of Bosniaks
- Bosnian genocide
