= Liplje camp =

Concentration camp in Bosnia and Herzegovina

- Concentration camp
- Location within Republika Srpska Location within Bosnia and Herzegovina
- Coordinates: 44°23′08″N 19°06′14″E
- Location: Liplje, Bosnia and Herzegovina
- Operated by: Serbs
- Operational: 25 May – 2 June 1992
- Inmates: Bosniaks
- Number of inmates: 420–460
- Killed: 27 Bosniaks

The Liplje camp (Serbo-Croatian: Logor Liplje) was a concentration camp operated between 25 May 1992 and 2 June 1992 by Army of Republika Srpska in the village Liplje near Zvornik during the Bosnian War. It was set up for Bosniak men, women and children, in an effort to ethnically cleanse the area of all non-Serb residents. The Liplje concentration camp was liberated after one week of operation; it is known for being the only camp with Bosniak victims to be liberated during the war.

== Overview ==
At the start of the Bosnian War armed Serb peasants from the nearby village of Snagovo overran Liplje on 1 May 1992 and, by 25 May, turned it into a concentration camp with the Bosniak residents becoming prisoners. Between 420 and 460 people were imprisoned; men, women and children were beaten, raped repeatedly and killed by Serbs. A total of 27 prisoners lost their lives. Escapees organized resistance groups in the towns of Cerska and Kamenica. On the night of 1–2 June 1992, about 300 Bosniaks armed with 27 rifles liberated the Liplje concentration camp. It became the only camp with Bosniak prisoners to be liberated in the entirety of the 1992–95 war. None of the camp guards have been prosecuted.
