= Pirići =

Pirići may refer to:

- Pirići (Bratunac), a village in Bosnia and Herzegovina
- Pirići (Bugojno), a village in Bosnia and Herzegovina
- Pirići, Vitez, a village in Bosnia and Herzegovina
