= Ahatovići massacre =

Atrocity during the Bosnian War

- Part of Bosnian War
- Ahatovići (Bosnia and Herzegovina)
- Location: 43°53′09″N 18°16′54″E; Ahatovići in Novi Grad, Sarajevo, Bosnia and Herzegovina
- Date: 14 June 1992 (Central European Time)
- Target: Bosniak prisoners of war
- Attack type: Mass killing
- Deaths: 47
- Perpetrator: Army of Republika Srpska

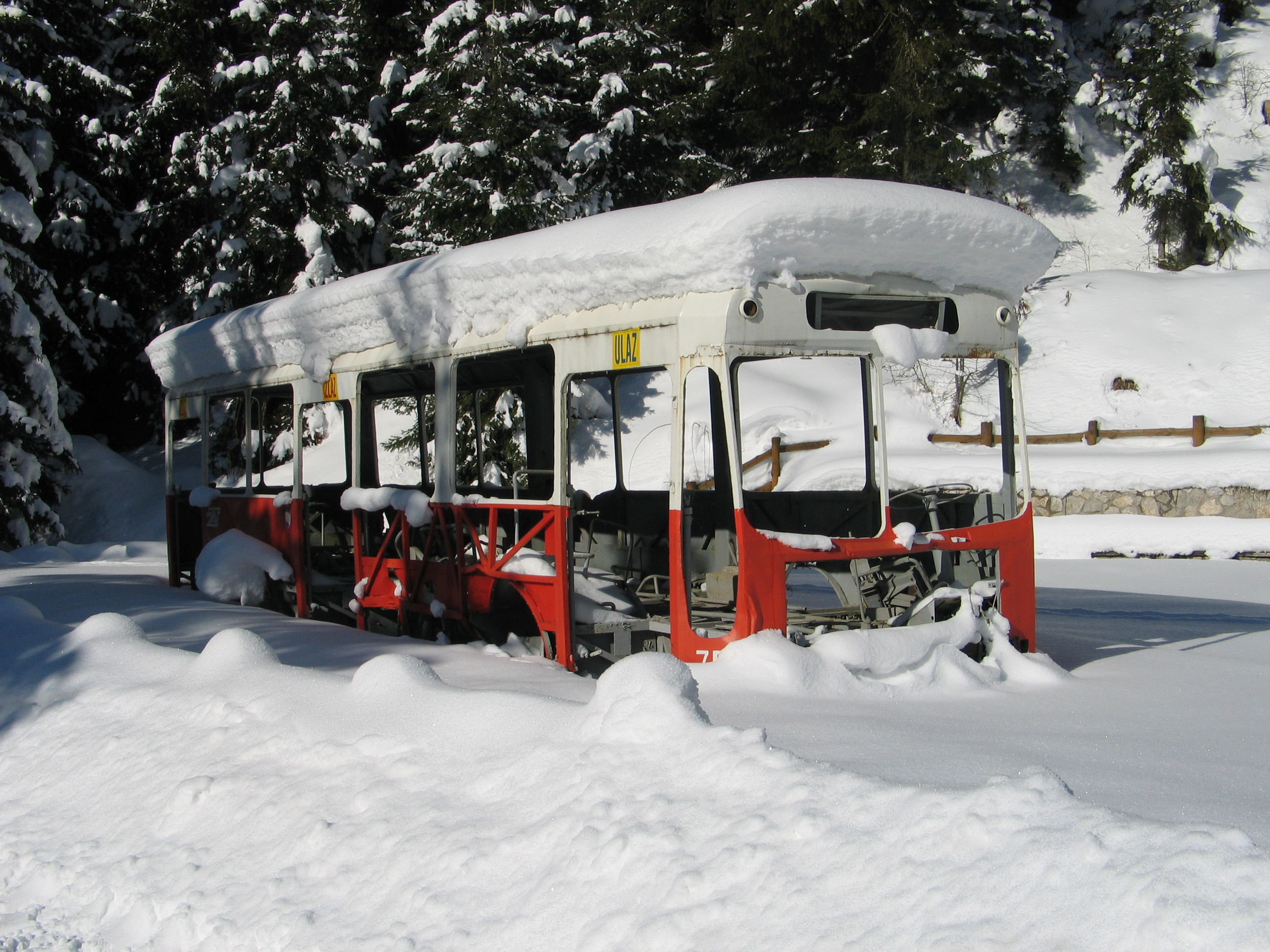

The Ahatovići massacre was the mass killing of 47 captured Bosniak soldiers from the suburb of Ahatovići, in the municipality of Novi Grad, Sarajevo by the Army of Republika Srpska during the Bosnian War.

== Massacre ==
From 29 May 1992 to 2 June 1992, the village of Ahatovići was shelled by Bosnian Serb units from the Yugoslav People's Army (JNA) barracks in the villages of Rajlovac and Butile. When the shelling stopped on 2 June 1992, the villagers were finally able to leave their shelters, and found that their homes had been burned to the ground. About 120 poorly armed men from Ahatovići tried to mount a defence as best they could, but they were unable to resist the onslaught from Bosnian Serb infantry and artillery attacks for long. Those who had not been killed in the battle surrendered soon afterwards. The prisoners were then taken to the barracks in Rajlovac, where they were kept in a hangar for almost two weeks in inhuman conditions, being beaten and tortured on a regular basis.

On 14 June, 56 prisoners from Ahatovići were ordered onto a bus. They were told that they were on their way to a prisoner exchange. The bus was stopped and the hostages, men between 17 and 63 years old, were told that the bus's radiator had boiled over and that they should lie face-down on the floor while water was fetched from a stream. According to survivors, Bosnian Serb gunmen then got off the bus, walked 30 yards up a stony hillside and opened fire on the vehicle with a bazooka and automatic weapons.

== Aftermath ==
The Bosnian Serbs left without checking for survivors; the eight surviving Bosniaks waited for nightfall to escape through the forest to a nearby Muslim village, whose residents buried the victims of the massacre the following day. In 1996, about 50 victims were exhumed from a mass grave beneath a meadow in the village of Sokolina, Ilijaš.

By the end of the Bosnian War, only one Bosniak family remained in Ahatovići. The atrocity was overlooked until 2001 when Dutch documentary maker Heddy Honigmann made a documentary about the massacre. The documentary was entitled Good Husband, Dear Son and visited the village. Survivors of the massacre and the families of the victims were interviewed about the war and their lives before and after.

== See also ==
- List of massacres in Bosnia and Herzegovina
- List of massacres of Bosniaks
- Bosnian genocide
