= Sjeverin =

Sjeverin Сјеверин
- Village
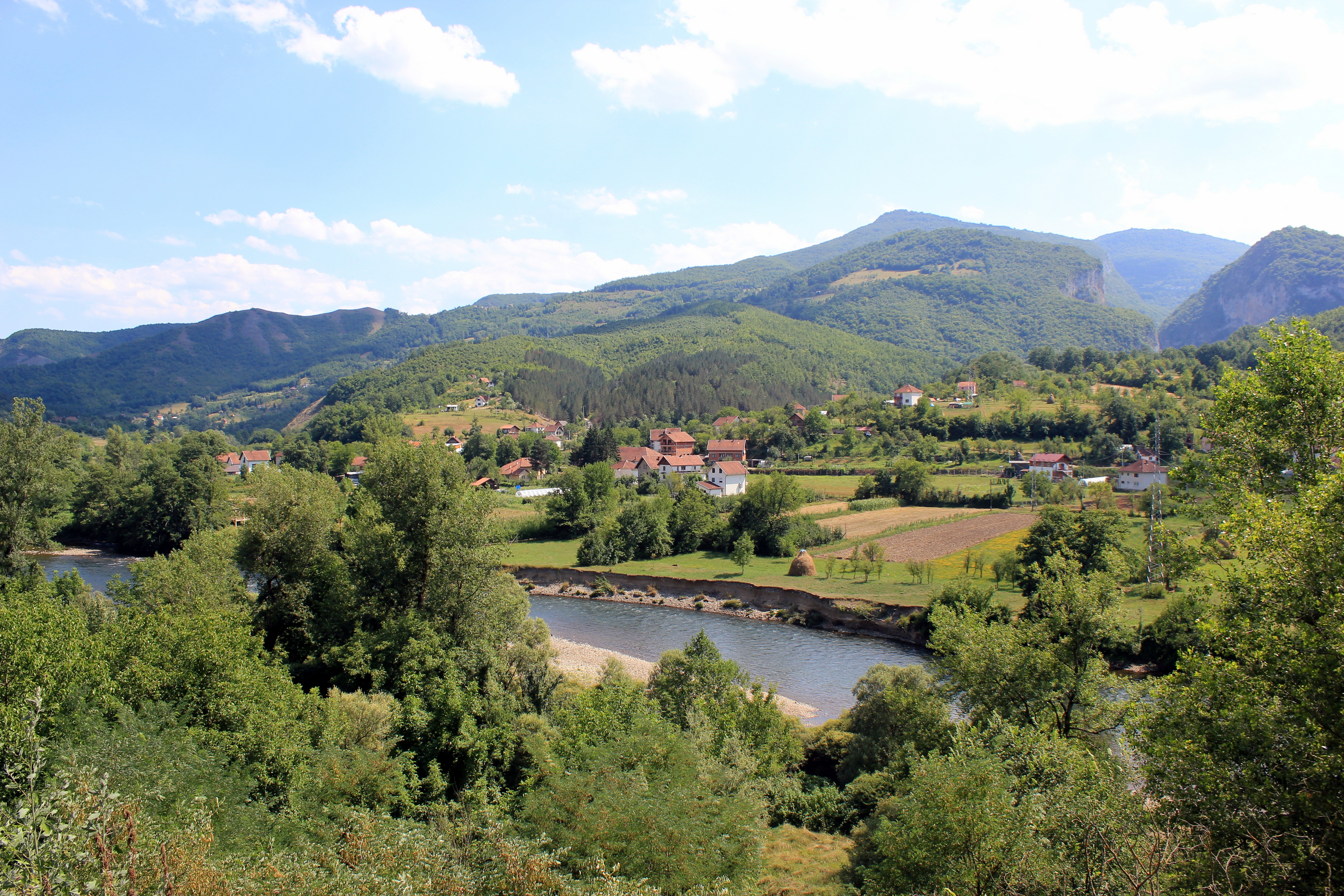

- Location within Serbia
- Coordinates: 43°35′N 19°22′E
- Country: Serbia
- Elevation: 447 m (1,467 ft)
- Time zone: UTC+1 (CET)
  - Summer (DST): UTC+2 (CEST)

Sjeverin (Serbian Cyrillic: Сјеверин) is a village in the Raška (Sandžak) area of Serbia, located in the municipality of Priboj, in the district of Zlatibor, close to the border with Bosnia and Herzegovina. According to the 2022 census, the village has a population of 553 people.

== History ==
In October 1992, during the Bosnian war, 16 Bosniak residents of Sjeverin were abducted and murdered by Milan Lukić and members of Osvetnici ("Avengers") paramilitary group in the Sjeverin massacre. Following the massacre, other Bosniaks fled the area. In 2006 the Sandžak Committee for Protection of Human Rights and Freedoms reported that the state was not working to facilitate the return of the population displaced by ethnic cleansing.

== Demographic history ==
Population
Census	Population
1948	240
1953	253
1961	304
1971	360
1981	424
1991	572
2002	337
2011	380

Ethnic composition of the population (1981)
Ethnicity	Population	%
Serbs	169	39.86%
Muslims	231	54.48%
Yugoslavs	22	5.19%
Unknown/Other	—	—
