= 25 May 1995 Tuzla massacre =

Civilian massacre

Tuzla massacre
- Part of the Bosnian War
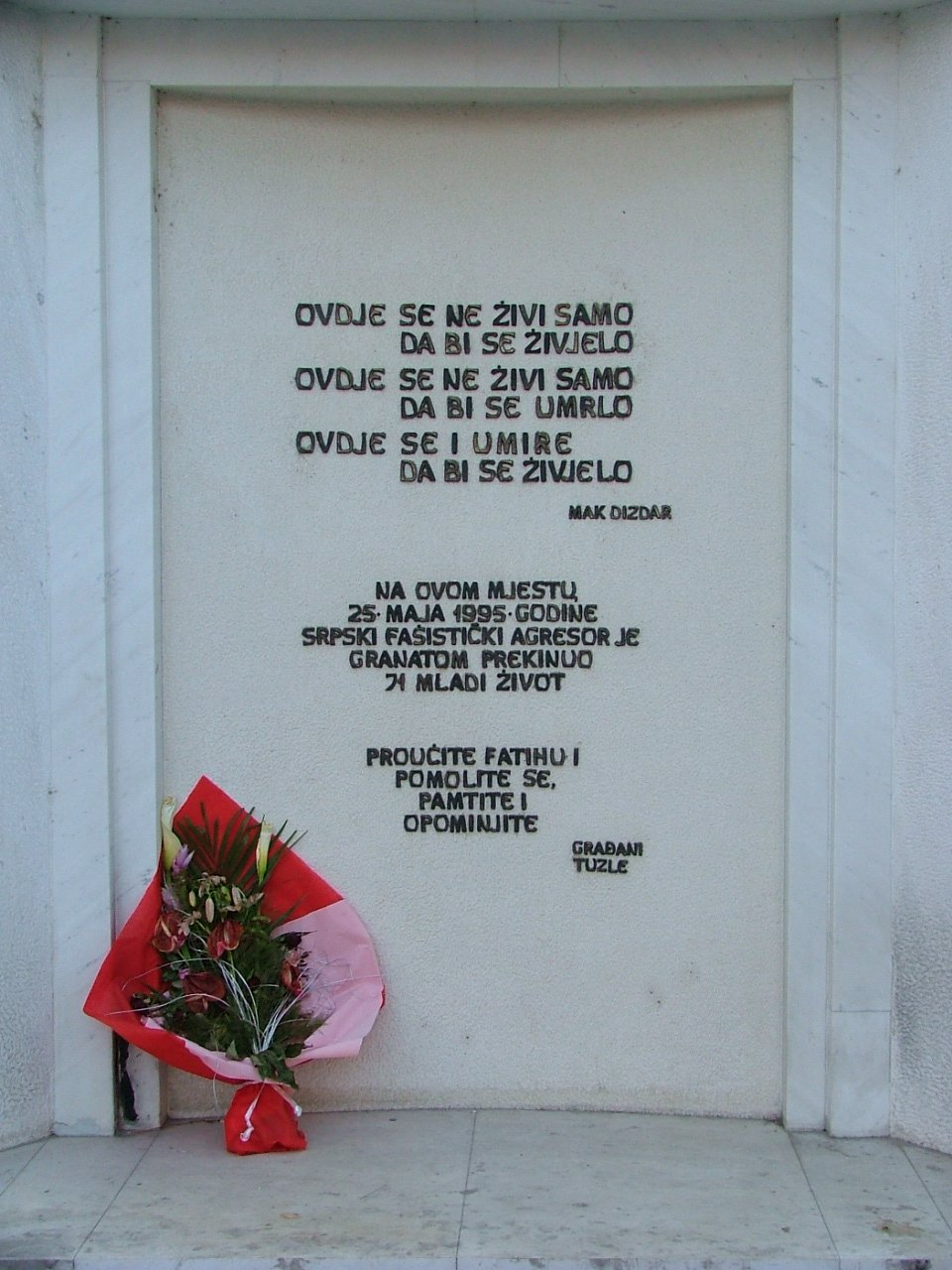

- Tuzla (Bosnia and Herzegovina)
- Location: 44°32′17″N 18°40′34″E; Tuzla, Bosnia and Herzegovina
- Date: 25 May 1995; 20:55 (UTC+1)
- Target: Civilians
- Attack type: Artillery fire
- Deaths: 71
- Injuries: 240
- Perpetrator: Army of Republika Srpska

On 25 May 1995, the Army of Republika Srpska (VRS) launched an artillery attack against the town of Tuzla as part of the Bosnian War, which left 71 civilians dead and another 240 wounded. The event is also known as the Tuzla massacre.

== Background ==
In the 1990 elections, Social Democrats won control of the Tuzla municipality, making it the only municipality in Bosnia where the nationalist SDA were not in power. Despite this, the then Mayor of Tuzla declared support for the newly formed Republic of Bosnia and Herzegovina. A war cabinet was set up in the city and a multi-ethnic police and army force were set up at the onset of hostilities. At the onset of the Bosnian civil war, JNA troops were still manning a garrison in the center of Tuzla and were under a virtual siege. On 15 May 1992, Tuzla authorities agreed to peacefully allow Yugoslav troops to withdraw from the garrison and evacuate to neighbouring Serbia. Despite the agreed withdrawal, the convoy of evacuating troops was attacked, at least 51 of whom were killed. Following this incident, units of the Army of the Republika Srpska set up artillery positions east of the city.

== The killing ==
Between 25 May and 28 May 1995 a number of artillery projectiles were fired at Tuzla from Army of Republika Srpska (VRS) positions near the village of Panjik on Mount Ozren some 25 km west of Tuzla. On 25 May 1995 (Marshal Tito's birthday and Relay of Youth in former Yugoslavia) at 20:55 hours, a high-explosive fragmentation shell fired by a 130mm towed artillery piece, detonated in a cafe located in Kapija Square. As a consequence 71 people killed and 240 wounded. All of the victims were civilians and the majority were between the ages of 18 and 25. Tuzla mayor Selim Bešlagić made a statement to the United Nations Security Council the same day calling the VRS "fascists" and urging "For the sake of The God and humanity use the force finally." On 25 and 26 May, NATO carried out air strikes against VRS ammunition depots in Pale after violations of the Exclusion Zones and shelling of UN Safe Areas.

The funerals of the victims took place four days later, at 4 AM, to avoid further shelling. 51 out of the 71 victims were buried together in the park's war cemetery.

The municipality of Tuzla has opened a small memorial museum near the Kapija, where to remember the established facts about the massacre of 25 May 1995 and its 71 victims, including all the documents from the trial, thanks to the cooperation with the Balkan Investigative Reporting Network.

== Prosecution ==
Novak Đukić, a former VRS officer was arrested in Banja Luka on 7 November 2007. At the time of the attack Đukić was the commander of Tactical Group Ozren. His trial began on 11 March 2008. On 12 June 2009, the Court of Bosnia and Herzegovina found Đukić guilty and sentenced him to 25 years imprisonment. On 10 September 2010 the Appellate Panel dismissed Đukić's appeals as unfounded and upheld the first instance verdict of 12 June 2009 in its entirety.

Đukić was released in February 2014, after the Constitutional Court of Bosnia and Herzegovina had nullified a series of rulings due to misapplication of the law (Maktouf-Damjanovic issue). In a new trial, he was again sentenced to 20 years of imprisonment in June 2014. Đukić absconded and repaired in Serbia, country of which he also had acquired citizenship. An arrest warrant was issued for him in October 2014, to no avail. Bosnia and Herzegovina then asked Serbia, on the basis of the existing protocols on judicial cooperation, to enforce the final ruling against Đukić in Serbia.

Proceedings in Serbia started only in February 2016. Đukić's defense used the proceedings to claim his innocence and spread historical revisionist theories about the massacre of Tuzla's Kapija. Đukić also delayed the trial by not attending the hearings for purported health reasons (hospitalisations at the Military Medical Academy). In 2018 experts claimed that Đukić was temporarily incapacitated and delayed the trial for one more year.

According to the EU's 2016 interim benchmarks for chapter 23 of the EU accession negotiations, Serbia is expected to "engages in meaningful regional cooperation and good neighbourly relations in handling of war crimes by avoiding conflicts of jurisdictions and ensuring that war crimes are prosecuted without any discrimination. All outstanding issues in this regard must be fully resolved."

== Historical revisionism ==
In 2009, Prime Minister of Republika Srpska Milorad Dodik stated that the attack was staged and questioned the Markale massacre at Sarajevo. The Tuzla municipality filed charges against Dodik over these statements. The city of Sarajevo filed criminal charges against Dodik for abuse of power, and inciting ethnic, racial and religious hatred. The Office of the High Representative said Dodik denied the war crimes committed and stated that "When such skewed facts come from an official in a position of high responsibility, an official who is obliged to uphold the Dayton Peace Accords and cooperate with the Hague Tribunal, then they are particularly irresponsible and undermine not only the institutions responsible for upholding the rule of law, but the credibility of the individual himself".

In March 2019, in an interview with the Serbian tabloid Večernje Novosti, Đukić claimed that “he deserves to have his name on the Tuzla Monument” and blamed the attack on a bomb hidden by "seven Islamic terrorists". The Radio Televizija Republike Srpske (RTRS) public channel, which reported on the revisionist statements, was later fined for 6.000 EUR by the Communications Regulatory Agency of Bosnia and Herzegovina for breach of ’fairness and impartiality’ as well as ’protection of privacy’. RTRS repeated again in May 2019 revisionist stances about the innocence of Đukić.

In November 2019 Đukić attended the promotion of The Gate of Tuzla – a Staged Tragedy, a revisionist novel by Ilija Branković, organised by the Serbian Ministry of Defence in the congress hall of the Serbian Army Hall in Belgrade. The Council of Europe's Commissioner for Human Rights Dunja Mijatović criticized the promotion of the book and stated that it "falsified the facts about the crime that took place in 1995 in Bosnia and Herzegovina." The promotion of the book was also condemned by the member of the Presidency of Bosnia and Herzegovina, Šefik Džaferović, the Chair of the Committee of the European Parliament for Stabilization and Association of Serbia to the European Union, Tanja Fajon and Serbia's Youth Initiative for Human Rights. The book was again promoted in Kruševac on 17 January 2020 and Kraljevo on 20 February 2020.

== See also ==
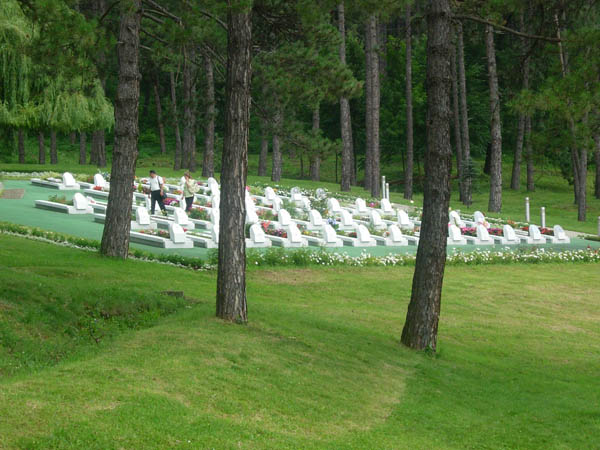
"Slana Banja" memorial complex

- 1992 Yugoslav People's Army column incident in Tuzla
- List of massacres in Bosnia and Herzegovina
- List of massacres of Bosniaks
