= Here massacre =

1994 massacre of the Croat-Bosniak War

- Part of the Croat–Bosniak War
- Location: Here, Prozor
- Date: 24 January 1994
- Target: Bosniaks
- Attack type: Mass killing
- Deaths: 34
- Perpetrator: Croatian Defence Council (HVO)

The Here massacre is the name for a war crime committed by the Croatian Defence Council (HVO) against Bosniak civilians in the village of Here on 24 January 1994, during operation Tvigi 94, of the Croat-Bosniak War.

== Crime ==
During Croat operation Tvigi 94, Croatian Defence Council pushed ARBiH from its position until they got the village of Here, in which members of the Croatian Defence Council killed 36 Bosniak civilians.

A correspondent from the Independent, Christopher Bellamy in his article, mentions the casualty of 19 men and 2 women of Bosnian origin.
