= Oborci massacre =

1995 killing of civilians by Bosnian Serb forces

- Part of the Bosnian genocide and the Bosnian War
- Native name: Masakr u Oborcima
- Location: Oborci, Donji Vakuf, Bosnia and Herzegovina
- Date: September 13, 1995
- Attack type: Mass shooting
- Deaths: 28
- Victims: Bosnian Muslim and Bosnian Croat civilians from Mrkonjić Grad
- Perpetrator: Army of Republika Srpska

The Oborci massacre occurred on September 13, 1995, when soldiers from the 1st Krajina Corps of the Army of Republika Srpska (VRS) abducted 24 Bosniak and 4 Croat civilians from the town of Mrkonjić Grad and executed them near a railway station in the then-abandoned village of Oborci in the municipality of Donji Vakuf. The victims were previously forced to dig trenches in various places in the upper Vrbas valley near the frontlines. The massacre took place just before Bosnian Serb forces withdrew from Donji Vakuf.
