= Đulići (Zvornik) =

Đulići Ђулићи
- Village
- Location within Republika Srpska Location within Bosnia and Herzegovina
- Coordinates: 44°27′20″N 19°04′10″E
- Country: Bosnia and Herzegovina
- Entity: Republika Srpska
- Municipality: Zvornik

Population (1991)
  - Total: 1,043
- Time zone: UTC+1 (CET)
  - Summer (DST): UTC+2 (CEST)

Đulići (Serbian Cyrillic: Ђулићи) is a village located in the Zvornik Municipality, Bosnia and Herzegovina.

Đulići is located around 12 km far from Zvornik.

== Demographics ==
The 1991 census showed Đulići had a total population of 1043:

- 1,022 – Muslims
- 17 – Serbs
- 4 – others

== See also ==
- Bijeli Potok massacre
