= Miroslav Deronjić =

- Born: 6 June 1954; Bratunac, Yugoslavia
- Died: 19 May 2007 (aged 52); Sweden
- Motive: Serbian nationalism, hatred of Bosniaks, desire to create a Greater Serbian state
- Convictions: Persecutions on political, racial and religious grounds as a crime against humanity
- Capture status: Deceased

Details
- Date apprehended: 7 July 2001

Miroslav Deronjić (Serbian Cyrillic: Мирослав Дероњић; 6 June 1954 – 19 May 2007) was a Bosnian Serb who was charged with persecution, a crime against humanity, by the International Criminal Tribunal for the Former Yugoslavia (ICTY) for his actions related to the Glogova massacre in the Bosnian village of Glogova.

Deronjić held the post of President of the Bratunac Municipal Board of the Serbian Democratic Party from 1990 to 1992, and was later a member of its main board. In this role he ordered the attack on Glogova. Deronjić was arrested in Bosnia on 7 July 2002. He originally pleaded not guilty to all charges, later pleading guilty to one charge of persecution. On 30 March 2004, he was sentenced to ten years' imprisonment.

Deronjić was serving his sentence in Sweden where he died, aged 52, from cancer, in a hospital.
