= Zenica massacre =

1993 mass killing during the Croat–Muslim War

- Part of the Croat–Bosniak War
- Location: 44°11′54″N 17°54′44″E; Zenica, Bosnia and Herzegovina
- Date: 19 April 1993
- Attack type: Mass killing
- Deaths: 16
- Injuries: >50
- Perpetrator: Croatian Defence Council (HVO)

The Zenica massacre happened on 19 April 1993, shortly after noon. Several shells fired from the Croatian Defence Council’s positions located in Putićevo village, about 16 km (9.9 mi) west of Zenica, killed 16 and injured over 50 civilians in a large crowd.

== Attack ==
At the time, there was significant commercial activity in the centre of the city, with about two to three thousand men, women and children in the area ultimately hit by shells.

The exact number of shells fired at the centre of Zenica is unknown. However, estimates place the number at nine shells shot from the Croatian Defence Council’s howitzers. A total of six shells hit the target, three series of two. The first attack began at about 12:10 local time, the second one with two shells at 12:24, and the final two shells at 12:29.

== Aftermath ==
ICTY charged HVO's general Tihomir Blaškić for the crime. There are two different claims about source of the fire: charge in the Blaškić process claims there were HVO's positions in Putićevo, while defence claimed that shelling perpetrator were Serbian forces from mountain Vlašić.

The Trial Chamber acquitted General Blaškić of all charges for which he was accused of the crime.

=== Memorial park ===
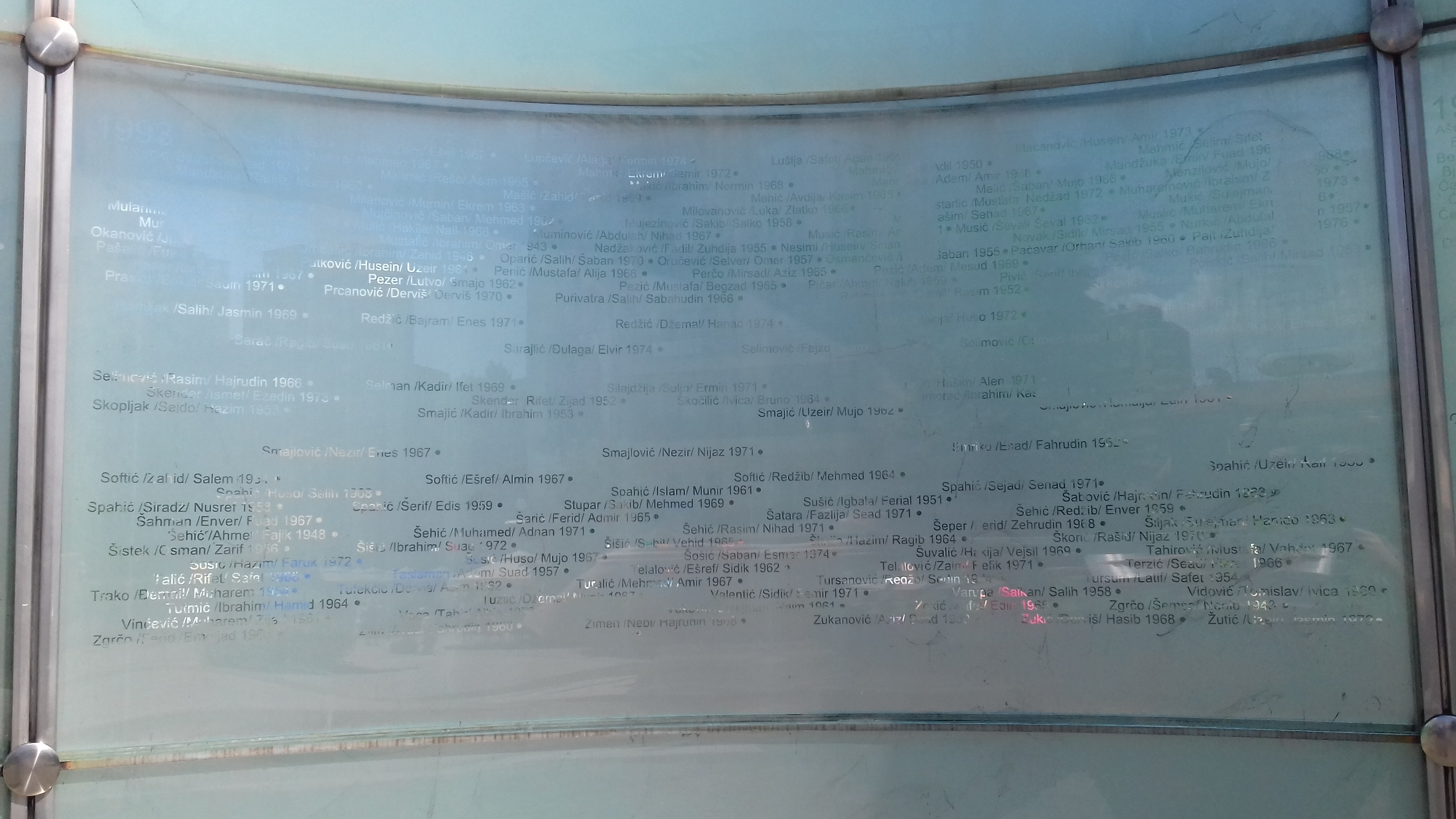
Part of the memorial monument with inscribed names of the victims

To remember the people killed after the crime of 19 April 1993, city square in Zenica became known as Stone Sleeper (translation of Kameni spavač, name of Mak Dizdar's work); it is a memorial park with large curved memorial sculpture with names of killed Zenicans, one fountain and memorial plate referring to Dizdar.

Also, the date of massacre is commemorated as a civilian victims' day of Bosnian War in Zenica.

== See also ==
- Bosnian genocide
- Croatian war crimes in the Yugoslav Wars
- List of massacres in the Bosnian War
- Velika Broda massacre
