= Snagovo massacre =

1992 killing of Bosnians by Serbs

- The woods in Snagovo where the victims were first captured.

- Location: 44°21′20″N 19°03′15″E; Snagovo, Bosnia and Herzegovina
- Date: 29 April 1992
- Target: Bosnian Muslims
- Attack type: Mass killing and ethnic cleansing
- Deaths: 36
- Perpetrator: Serb paramilitary groups including the White Eagles

The Snagovo massacre refers to the mass killing of 36 Bosnian Muslim civilians by Serbs on 29 April 1992 in the village Snagovo, located in the municipality of Zvornik, Bosnia and Herzegovina. The massacre occurred at the start of the Bosnian War.

== Background ==
Snagovo was among the hardest hit villages at the start of the Bosnian War in 1992. Between April and June 1992, Serbs ethnically cleansed the village of its Bosnian Muslim residents.

== Massacre ==
On 29 April 1992, Serbs captured a group of 36 Bosnian Muslim civilians who were hiding in the woods in Snagovo and took them to a school building in Rašidov Han within Snagovo. In total, all 36 Bosnian Muslim civilians were killed, including children and pregnant women. The corpses were burned in an effort to conceal the crime. On 2 May 1992, fellow residents of Snagovo found the burned remains and buried them nearby. One of the residents said "We came to this site and dug a grave. However, during the burial, our Serb neighbors shot at us. We later buried them (the victims) in the dark."

== Exhumation and reburial ==
The remains of the victims were exhumed from the original place of burial on 16 March 2006. On 27 July 2011, 21 of the victims were given a proper burial in a joint grave at a local cemetery in Snagovo including the youngest victim, six-month old Meliha Dogić who was killed in the arms of her mother. The girl's mother and father were also killed. Most of the victims were not identifiable because their bodies had burnt so badly.

== Trials ==
Serbian Major Zoran Janković was arrested 9 May 2006. The Court of Bosnia and Herzegovina confirmed his indictment on 8 November 2006. Janković plead not guilty on 24 November 2006. His trial began on 26 March 2007. Survivors described being taken to Rašidov Han and shot at by Janković and other Serbs. Witnesses said that Janković introduced himself as a White Eagle and showed off a knife with which he claimed to have killed in the Vukovar massacre in Croatia. Janković was on trial for the killing of 36 people and wounding of three others in Snagovo, as well as for the forced removal of captured civilians in the nearby villages of Šeher and Like in May 1992. He was acquitted of crimes against humanity on 19 June 2007 due to lack of evidence and released.

== Related events ==
Seven mass graves, containing the skeletal remains of 156 individuals, victims of the July 1995 Srebrenica Genocide, were uncovered in Snagovo. The 156 victims were moved to the seven "secondary graves" in Snagovo from the original burial sites around Srebrenica to hide the traces of the atrocity. Among other massacres, six more people were killed in the village on 22 July 1995.

== See also ==
- Crni Vrh, Zvornik
- List of massacres of Bosniaks
- Bosnian genocide
