= Operation Tvigi 94 =

1994 military operation

- Part of the Croat–Bosniak War
Date	24 January - 21 February 1994.
Location	Prozor-Rama, Bosnia and Herzegovina
Result	HVO victory
Territorial changes	Capture of the village of Here

Belligerents
Herzeg-Bosnia	Bosnia and Herzegovina

Commanders and leaders
(Croatian Republic of Herzeg-Bosnia) Slobodan Praljak (Croatian Republic of Herzeg-Bosnia) Ante Roso	(Bosnia and Herzegovina) Rasim Delić

Units involved
Croatian Defence Council	ARBiH

Strength
(Croatian Republic of Herzeg-Bosnia) 100–250	(Bosnia and Herzegovina) 250–400

Operation Tvigi '94 (Croatian: Operacija Tvigi '94) was a military operation during the Croat-Bosniak War which was conducted by the Croatian Defence Council (HVO), it began on 24 January and lasted till February 21 1994. and was a tactical victory for the HVO.

HVO forces captured the village of Here from the Army of the Republic of Bosnia and Herzegovina. The operation, carried out by the Rama Brigade, secured a tactical advantage by seizing high ground that allowed the HVO to halt the offensive of the opposing forces in that sector. These territorial changes altered the balance of power on the Rama–Uskoplje front, stabilizing the HVO defensive positions during the final stages of the conflict between the HVO and the Republic of Bosnia and Herzegovina.

According to historian Davor Marijan in his study published by the Croatian Institute of History, this engagement served as a prelude to the diplomatic processes that led to the Washington Agreement, which eventually ended the Croat–Bosniak War.

== See also ==
- Here massacre
