= Čemerno massacre =

1992 massacre of Serbs during the Bosnian War

- Part of Bosnian War
- Čemerno (Bosnia and Herzegovina)
- Location: 44°02′12″N 18°22′21″E; Čemerno in Ilijaš, Bosnia and Herzegovina
- Date: 10 June 1992 (Central European Time)
- Target: Serbs
- Attack type: Mass killing
- Deaths: 32 (7 of them were children)

The Čemerno massacre refers to the massacre of ethnic Serbs of the village of Čemerno, Ilijaš, in the Ilijaš Municipality, near Sarajevo, on 10 June 1992, during the Bosnian War.

== Background ==
Some sources state that the attack was carried out by the members of the 304th Mountain Brigade of the Army of the Republic of Bosnia and Herzegovina from Breza and were commanded by the war time mayor of the municipality of Salko Opačin, the head of the police department Meho Kulić and others. A purported reason for the massacre, according to Bosniak sources, was that the village was the place from where the town of Breza was shelled by artillery, but at the same time Čemerno was inhabited by civilians.

== Investigation ==
Immediately after the incident, one of the survivors was recorded by British television. According to his testimony, the attack had been carried out by Croats, while another eyewitness later also mentioned the Bosniaks which was later proved to be more accurate than the first report. Although later reports attributed it to Army of Bosnia and Herzegovina and "Muslim armed forces", the original indictment filed on 17 July 1992 mentions six individual Croatian persons. The indictments were also immediately published in Serbian media. The investigation was stalled and an attempt at their retrieval in 2005 by a media outlet was unsuccessful.

By 2007, the County Prosecutor of Istočno Sarajevo claimed the police had filed a full report in 2006, and that their investigation was being completed. Another news report mentions that a Muslim prisoner of war (captured later in the war) had confessed to participating in the killing and named several others.

According to different media information, either 29, 31 or 32 Evidence that both military and civilian Serbs were murdered includes a video recording made at the site of the crime, which contains the testimony of one Petar Rašević and a surviving member of the Trifković family. According to the initial reports, those killed included 7 children.

The houses and other belongings and property were plundered and burned. Three villagers who heard the attack and the cries of the victims were able to escape from their houses. Media reports include the names of at least two elderly women whose bodies were found burned.

Republika Srpska media stated that the Bosnian Army stole 1,500 sheep and 100 heads of cattle. Republika Srpska's Ministry of Internal Affairs has stated that 15 soldiers (3 in command, 12 perpetrators) were involved in the massacre.

== Mass graves ==
In 1999, 30 bodies were exhumed from a mass grave in Čemerno by the Republika Srpska Commission for Searching Missing Individuals. As some were burned, the head of the commission's operating team, Slobodan Škrba, stated that not all bodies will be found. Forensic analysis of the exhumed victims showed that they were violently murdered, mostly with heavy objects. In accordance with the wishes of the families, the remains were re-buried at the Military cemetery in Sokolac.

In 2009, Škrba stated that 49 Serb bodies had been exhumed in the area of Čemerno altogether.

None of the houses destroyed in the attack have been rebuilt, and Čemerno is now uninhabited. On 22 September 2007, representatives of the Organization of Families of the Captured and Killed from East Sarajevo unveiled a monument to the victims in Čemerno.

== War Crimes ==
In December 2017, 11 former members of the Bosnian army had been charged over the massacre. The prosecutor’s office said that the men who were arrested are suspected of war crimes against civilians and prisoners of war, the killing and wounding of enemy combatants and violations of the laws and customs of war. Adding that the crime in Čemerno was one of the worst in the entire Sarajevo region. In February 2018, the 11 men were formally indicted and their trial set to begin. In April 2018, former Territorial Defence commander Nehru Ganic was charged with command responsibility for the massacre.

== See also ==
- Video recording of the site of the crime
- Witness accounts of the massacre - RTRS
- TV report about the Čemerno massacre: Part One and Part Two
