= Orašlje massacre (1943) =

Ustaš German massacre against Muslim population

- Mosque from the village
- Location: Orašlje, Rotimlja, Stolac, Independent State of Croatia
- Date: 12 July 1943
- Target: Bosniaks
- Attack type: Summary execution
- Deaths: 68
- Perpetrators: 7th SS Volunteer Mountain Division Prinz Eugen; Ustaše

The Orašlje massacre was perpetrated by the Ustaše and Germans on 12 July 1943, under the command of Jakija Miljković, against 68 Muslims.

== Course of the attack ==
The crime occurred after the Germans learned that the Muslims of Orašlje were hiding Partisans and assisting the National Liberation Movement. News that Partisans were hiding in Orašlje reached the Germans through the Ustaše župan and lawyer Jakija Miljković, who soon organized a criminal expedition. The task was entrusted to units of the 7th SS Volunteer Mountain Division Prinz Eugen and local Ustaše.

At dawn on 12 July, German and Ustaše troops, without warning, surrounded the Orašlje hamlet, arriving from Mostar, Domanovići, and Stolac. The SS perpetrators forced all the villagers they encountered in the fields into houses and barns, where they subsequently opened fire, killing everyone they found, without distinguishing between men, women, and children. Among those killed were 25 children under the age of 15. The youngest victims were babies only a few months old.

After killing the inhabitants, the Germans and Ustaše set fire to all the houses and barns. Among the dead lay several wounded Muslim civilians who had pretended to be dead. They managed to escape from the burning houses in order to save their lives.

A total of 68 Muslim civilians were killed in the attack.
