= Trnova, Sanski Most =

Trnova Трнова
- Village
- Location within Bosnia and Herzegovina
- Coordinates: 44.799756°N 16.660587°E
- Country: Bosnia and Herzegovina
- Entity: Federation of Bosnia and Herzegovina
- Canton: Una-Sana
- Municipality: Sanski Most

Area
  - Total: 5.53 sq mi (14.31 km^{2})

Population (2013)
  - Total: 783
  - Density: 142/sq mi (54.7/km^{2})
- Time zone: UTC+1 (CET)
  - Summer (DST): UTC+2 (CEST)

Trnova is a village in the municipality of Sanski Most, Federation of Bosnia and Herzegovina, Bosnia and Herzegovina.

== Demographics ==
According to the 2013 census, its population was 783.

Ethnicity in 2013
| Ethnicity | Number | Percentage |
|---|---|---|
| Bosniaks | 767 | 98.0% |
| Croats | 12 | 1.5% |
| other/undeclared | 4 | 0.5% |
| Total | 783 | 100% |
