= Gaćice =

- Village
- Location within Bosnia and Herzegovina
- Coordinates: 44.1498044°N 17.7616004°E
- Country: Bosnia and Herzegovina
- Entity: Federation of Bosnia and Herzegovina
- Canton: Central Bosnia
- Municipality: Vitez

Area
  - Total: 1.76 sq mi (4.56 km^{2})

Population (2013)
  - Total: 625
  - Density: 355/sq mi (137/km^{2})
- Time zone: UTC+1 (CET)
  - Summer (DST): UTC+2 (CEST)

Gaćice (Serbian Cyrillic: Гаћице) is a village in the municipality of Vitez, Bosnia and Herzegovina.

== Demographics ==
According to the 2013 census, its population was 625.

Ethnicity in 2013
Ethnicity	Number	Percentage
Bosniaks	293	46.9%
Croats	281	45.0%
Serbs	1	0.2%
other/undeclared	50	8.0%
Total	625	100%
