= Bijeli Potok massacre =

1992 massacre in Bosnia and Herzegovina

- Đulići (Bosnia and Herzegovina)
- Location: 44°27′20″N 19°04′10″E; Bijeli Potok, Bosnia and Herzegovina
- Date: 1 June 1992
- Target: Bosniaks
- Attack type: Mass killing and ethnic cleansing
- Deaths: 675
- Perpetrators: Serbs (Yellow Wasps, Army of the Republika Srpska)

The Bijeli Potok massacre refers to the mass killing of 675 Bosniak civilians by Serbs on 1 June 1992 in the settlement Bijeli Potok within the village Đulići, located in the municipality of Zvornik, Bosnia and Herzegovina. About 675 Bosniak men and boys, from the multiple villages around Zvornik, were separated from their families by Serb forces, and slaughtered within a week at Bijeli Potok and their bodies hidden in mass graves throughout the Drina Valley.

As of May 2020, the remains of about 245 of the victims have yet to be found.

== Background and overview ==
The Bosnian War started in spring of 1992. On 8 April 1992, Serbs (of the Army of Republika Srpska and Serbian volunteer soldiers) occupied the city of Zvornik and began occupying and ethnically cleansing surrounding villages of the Bosnian Muslim inhabitants. Bosnian Muslims were ethnically cleansed from all villages between April and May 1992, including Hajdarevići, Dardagani, Đulići, Bijeli Potok, Kučić Kula, Klisa, Šetići, Lupići, Petkovci, Tršić, Radava, Liplje, Čelišmani, Mahmutovići, Sjenokos, and Džine. Some were chased out to the village Klisa. On 31 May 1992 Nurija Jašarević, president of the local community Klisa, and Alija Đulić, president of the local community Đulići, made a deal with the Serb invaders that all of the Bosnian Muslims would relocate to the safe area of Sapna via trucks, cars and tractors in the morning. This never occurred and the following day a massacre occurred in which most Bosnian Muslim men and boys, aged 15 to 80, were killed by the Serbs.

The largest number of victims in this massacre from a single village was from Đulići, with between 176 and 188 victims killed in the 1 June 1992 massacre.

== Mass graves and remains ==
In 2003, the Crni Vrh mass grave was uncovered, containing the remains of 629 Bosnian Muslim victims of massacres around Zvornik and Srebrenica during the war. Some of the victims were killed in the Bijeli Potok massacre, and multiple other massacres including the Srebrenica Genocide.

== Related events ==
Retribution for this massacre is believed to be the motive behind the 2015 Zvornik police station shooting. The shooter, Nerdin Ibrić, was one year old at the time of the massacre, when his father Sejfo was taken by Serbs from the Army of Republika Srpska and became one of the 675 Bosnian Muslim victims of the massacre.
