= Kukavice massacre =

Bosnian War mass killing

- Location: Kukavice, Bosnia and Herzegovina
- Date: 27 August 1992
- Target: Bosnian Serbs
- Attack type: Mass killing
- Deaths: 21
- Perpetrator: Army of the Republic of Bosnia and Herzegovina (ARBiH) forces

The Kukavice massacre was the mass murder of 21 Bosnian Serb civilians by the Army of the Republic of Bosnia and Herzegovina (ARBiH) on 27 August 1992 in the village of Kukavice, located in the municipality of Rogatica, during the Bosnian War.

== Crime ==
On 27 August 1992, Army of the Republic of Bosnia and Herzegovina (ARBiH) troops attacked a convoy of Bosnian Serb civilians in the village of Kukavice, mainly consisting of women, children and the elderly. The column of fleeing civilians had been traveling from the village of Jabuka towards Rogatica when they were fired upon; there were about one thousand elderly men, women and children on tractors and in passenger vehicles. One of the survivors of the attack stated that bodies were left lying on the canyon road for nearly 40 days to decompose, before a group of Serbs arrived to pick them up for burial. 21 people were killed and 39 were wounded.

== Trial ==
In December 2013, members of Bosnia's State Investigation and Protection Agency arrested seven men in connection with the crime, after the Ministry of Internal Affairs of Republika Srpska had filed a war crimes report in 2006. As part of the evidence, a video of the crime scene was presented. Controversy had previously ensued after parts of it had allegedly been used in the film No Man's Land by Danis Tanović with the victims being represented as Bosniaks.

In a first-instance verdict in March 2017, the four accused who had been put on trial, Muhamed and Tarik Sisic, Emir Drakovac and Aziz Susa, were acquitted. However, the Appeals Chamber quashed the verdict and ordered a retrial. In October 2018, the four were found guilty and sentenced to a total of 29 years in prison. Muhamed Sisic was sentenced to eight years in prison, Tarik Sisic and Aziz Susa to five years each and Emir Drakovac to 11 years. The trial chamber took into the account Drakovac's murder, beheading and genital mutilation of another civilian as well as the torture of a Serb soldier, in a separate case, when considering his sentence for the crimes in Kukavice (his combined verdict was 15 years). In April 2019, Muhamed Sisic's sentence was increased to 10 years and Tarik Sisic and Aziz Susa to 8 years each. Muhamed Sisic was commander of the Sabotage Squad of the Bosnian Army's Kukavice Company, while Tarik Sisic and Susa were members of the same company.
