= Krpeljići =

- Village
- Location within Bosnia and Herzegovina
- Coordinates: 44.2448144°N 17.7099341°E
- Country: Bosnia and Herzegovina
- Entity: Federation of Bosnia and Herzegovina
- Canton: Central Bosnia
- Municipality: Travnik

Area
  - Total: 0.33 sq mi (0.85 km^{2})

Population (2013)
  - Total: 629
  - Density: 1,900/sq mi (740/km^{2})
- Time zone: UTC+1 (CET)
  - Summer (DST): UTC+2 (CEST)

Krpeljići is a village in the municipality of Travnik, Bosnia and Herzegovina.

== Demographics ==
According to the 2013 census, its population was 629.

Ethnicity in 2013
Ethnicity	Number	Percentage
Bosniaks	521	82.8%
Croats	96	15.3%
other/undeclared	12	1.9%
Total	629	100%
