= Grahovci =

- Village
- Location within Bosnia and Herzegovina
- Coordinates: 43°53′57″N 18°09′51″E
- Country: Bosnia and Herzegovina
- Entity: Federation of Bosnia and Herzegovina
- Canton: Central Bosnia
- Municipality: Kiseljak

Area
  - Total: 0.99 sq mi (2.56 km^{2})

Population (2013)
  - Total: 65
  - Density: 66/sq mi (25/km^{2})
- Time zone: UTC+1 (CET)
  - Summer (DST): UTC+2 (CEST)

Grahovci is a village in the municipality of Kiseljak, Bosnia and Herzegovina.

== Demographics ==
According to the 2013 census, its population was 65.

Ethnicity in 2013
Ethnicity	Number	Percentage
Bosniaks	39	60.0%
Croats	14	21.5%
Serbs	10	15.4%
other/undeclared	2	3.1%
Total	65	100%
