= Marš mira =

Annual event remembering the Srebrenican genocide

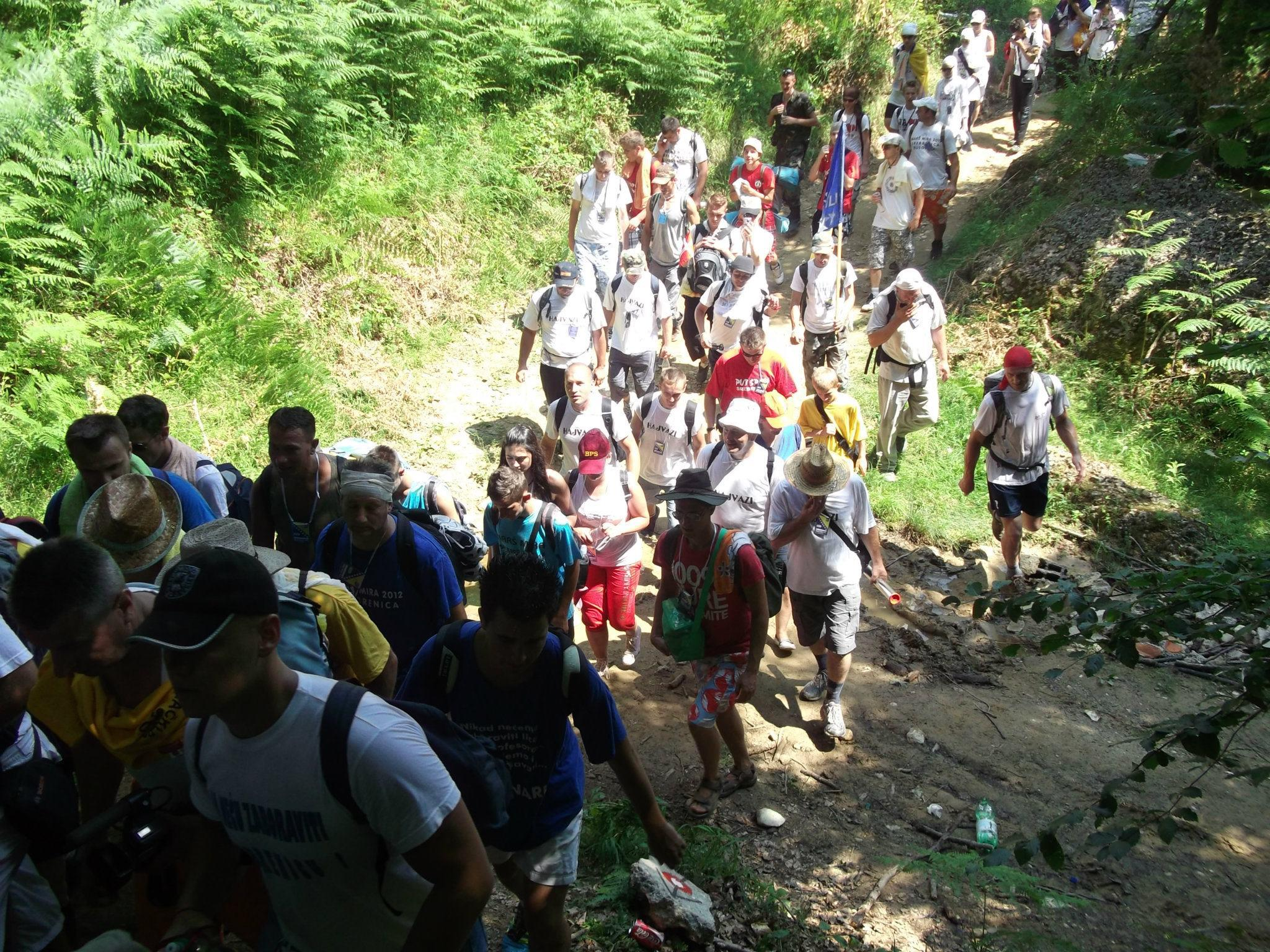
- The 2012 March.
- Date: 2005
- Also known as: March of Peace or Peace March
- Cause: In memory of the victims of the Srebrenica genocide
- Website: MaršMira.net

The March of Peace (Bosnian: Marš mira) is an annual peace walk in Bosnia and Herzegovina organized in memory of the victims of the 1995 Srebrenica genocide. The march gathers thousands of Bosnians and foreigners each year. The first march was held in 2005, to mark the tenth anniversary of the genocide. The campaign lasts three days, culminating in the participants' arrival to the village Potočari, where the Srebrenica Genocide Memorial-Cemetery is located. The participants arrive a day prior for the mass funeral that occurs for those victims whose bodies have been found the previous year. The search for bodies of the victims is ongoing every year.

== Background ==
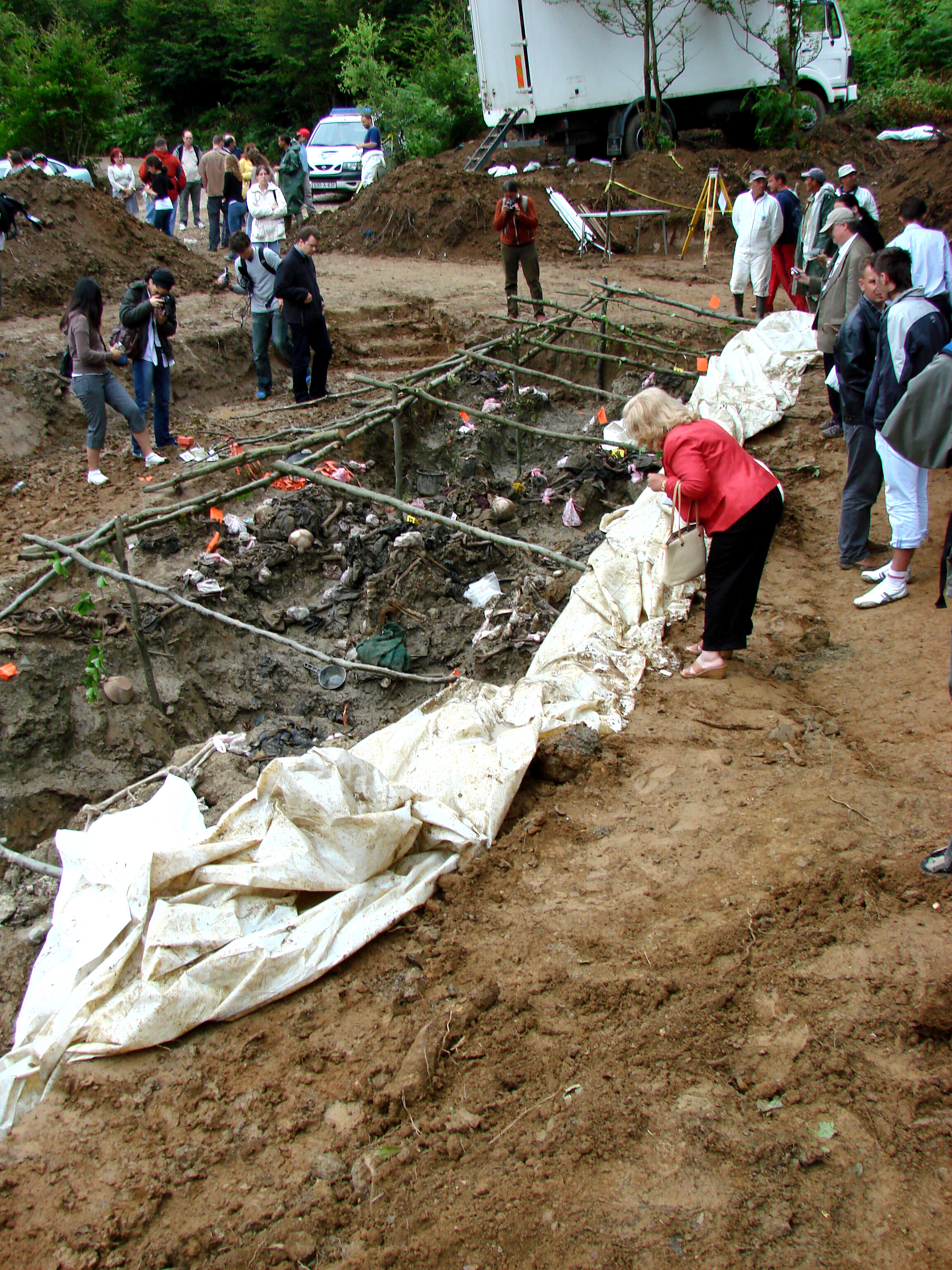
Delegates of the International Association of Genocide Scholars (IAGS) examine an exhumed mass grave of the victims, outside the village of Potočari, Bosnia and Herzegovina in July 2007

The Srebrenica genocide, resulted in the genocidal killing of more than 8,000 Bosniak Muslim men and boys in and around the town of Srebrenica during the Bosnian War. It was mainly perpetrated by units of the Bosnian Serb Army of Republika Srpska under Ratko Mladić, with the partial participation of the Serb paramilitary unit Scorpions. The massacre was the first legally recognised genocide in Europe since the end of World War II.

On July 11, 1995 Bosnian Serbs overran a United Nations protected area in Srebrenica and separated more than 8,000 Bosniak men and boys from the women and girls. They were then killed by the troops and any that tried to escape were chased throughout the woods and mountains surrounding the town. The deceased were tossed into mass graves at first, then were dug up via bulldozer and scattered around the surrounding area in an attempt to hide the remains.

The march, which has been organized since 2005, marks the killing of Bosniaks who survived after the fall of Srebrenica in July 1995 and tried to reach the territory controlled by the Army of the Republic of Bosnia and Herzegovina. The Peace March became an international event, and a large number of people from around the world joined the March.

== Event ==
The march is an annual event that aims to retrace the 100 kilometer (60 mile) march, through the forests of eastern Bosnia that were taken by Bosniak men and boys during the war and resulting genocide. In addition to the pedestrian campaigns, support also comes from participants who engaged in Cycling Marathons. The march usually begins in the village Nezuk by Sapna on or around 8 July.

In 2012, there were nearly 8,000 participants. To commemorate the 20th anniversary in 2015 thousands participated in the march, with some survivors participating. the During the 2024 march, there were an estimated 6,000 people who attended the march, and that year the United Nations approved a resolution to establish an international day of reflection and commemoration of the victims. In early July 2025 to commemorate the thirtieth anniversary of the genocide it was announced that at least 6,650 people would participate in the march.

== International response ==
- United States – On 8 July 2013, the US Ambassador to Bosnia and Herzegovina Patrick Moon held a brief speech to participants during the march, saying that he was honored to attend such an event and that he wanted to pay tribute to the victims of genocide in Srebrenica.
