= Preočica =

- Village
- Location within Bosnia and Herzegovina
- Coordinates: 44.1911822°N 17.8088685°E
- Country: Bosnia and Herzegovina
- Entity: Federation of Bosnia and Herzegovina
- Canton: Central Bosnia
- Municipality: Vitez

Area
  - Total: 1.03 sq mi (2.68 km^{2})

Population (2013)
  - Total: 1,071
  - Density: 1,040/sq mi (400/km^{2})
- Time zone: UTC+1 (CET)
  - Summer (DST): UTC+2 (CEST)

Preočica is a village in the municipality of Vitez, Bosnia and Herzegovina.

== Demographics ==
According to the 2013 census, its population was 1,071.

Ethnicity in 2013
Ethnicity	Number	Percentage
Bosniaks	1,070	99.9%
other/undeclared	1	0.1%
Total	1,071	100%
