= Wolfgang Schomburg =

German judge (born 1948)

Judge at the Federal Court of Justice of Germany
- In office 1995–2000

Judge of the International Criminal Tribunal for the former Yugoslavia
- In office 2001–2007

Judge of International Criminal Tribunal for Rwanda

Personal details
- Born: 1948 (age 77–78) Berlin, Germany
- Alumni: Freie Universität Berlin, London School of Economics

Wolfgang Schomburg (born 9 April 1948 in Berlin) was the first German Judge at the International Criminal Tribunal for the former Yugoslavia (ICTY) and the International Criminal Tribunal for Rwanda. From 1995 until 2000 he was a judge at the Federal Court of Justice in Karlsruhe. In 2007 he resigned from the bench of the Appeals Chamber of the ICTY, asserting the trial could no longer be fair given that the defendant was representing himself without the assistance of a lawyer.

Schomburg studied law in Berlin and passed his first legal state examination at the Freie Universität Berlin in 1971, and the second in 1974. The same year he became a public prosecutor in Berlin (West), was a judge and eventually senior public prosecutor of Berlin. From 1989 to 1991 he was Undersecretary of State at the Senate Justice Department in the city-state of Berlin, and then until 1995 worked as a lawyer in Berlin. In 1995 he was appointed Judge at the Federal High Court. He is editor of the German leading commentary on "International Cooperation in Criminal Matters", currently 4th ed. Munich, 2006. Specialized in International Criminal Law, Transnational Criminal Law, Human Rights and Mutual Cooperation in Criminal Matters he gave lectures on these topics at leading Universities and related Institutions all over the world. He is member of the Board of Directors of the AIDP (Pau/Paris), ERA, Trier, and the MPI, Freiburg. In March 2018 he joined the legal defense of Carles Puigdemont.
