= Raštani, Veles =

Raštani Раштани
- Village
- Location within North Macedonia
- Coordinates: 41.723516°N 21.713115°E
- Country: North Macedonia
- Region: Vardar
- Municipality: Veles

Population (2002)
  - Total: 286
- Time zone: UTC+1 (CET)
  - Summer (DST): UTC+2 (CEST)
- Car plates: VE
- Website: .

Raštani (Macedonian: Раштани) is a village in the municipality of Veles, North Macedonia.

== Demographics ==
According to the 2002 census, the village had a total of 286 inhabitants. Ethnic groups in the village include:

- Macedonians 286
