= Putićevo =

- Village
- Location within Bosnia and Herzegovina
- Coordinates: 44.2194763°N 17.7019574°E
- Country: Bosnia and Herzegovina
- Entity: Federation of Bosnia and Herzegovina
- Canton: Central Bosnia
- Municipality: Travnik

Area
  - Total: 2.71 sq mi (7.03 km^{2})

Population (2013)
  - Total: 1,193
  - Density: 440/sq mi (170/km^{2})
- Time zone: UTC+1 (CET)
  - Summer (DST): UTC+2 (CEST)

Putićevo is a village in the municipality of Travnik, Bosnia and Herzegovina.

== Demographics ==
According to the 2013 census, its population was 1,193.

Ethnicity in 2013
Ethnicity	Number	Percentage
Croats	1,158	97.1%
Bosniaks	14	1.2%
Serbs	9	0.8%
other/undeclared	12	1.0%
Total	1,193	100%
