= Glogova (Bratunac) =

Glogova Глогова
- Village
- Location within Bosnia and Herzegovina
- Coordinates: 44°12′36″N 19°15′36″E
- Country: Bosnia and Herzegovina
- Entity: Republika Srpska
- Municipality: Bratunac

Population (2013)
  - Total: 962
- Time zone: UTC+1 (CET)
  - Summer (DST): UTC+2 (CEST)

Glogova (Serbian Cyrillic: Глогова) is a village in the municipality of Bratunac, Bosnia and Herzegovina, where on 9 May 1992, in the early days of the Bosnian War (1992–95), 65 Bosnian Muslim civilians were killed in a Glogova massacre ordered by Miroslav Deronjić, President of the Bratunac Municipal Board of the Serbian Democratic Party (SDS) of Bosnia and Herzegovina.
