= Barimo =

- Village
- Location within Republika Srpska Location within Bosnia and Herzegovina
- Coordinates: 43°50′08″N 19°14′33″E
- Country: Bosnia and Herzegovina
- Entity: Republika Srpska
- Municipality: Višegrad

Population (1991)
  - Total: 78
- Time zone: UTC+1 (CET)
  - Summer (DST): UTC+2 (CEST)

Barimo is a village in the Višegrad Municipality in Bosnia and Herzegovina.

== History ==
During the Bosnian War, the village was the site of a massacre of Bosniak civilians, primarily the elderly and children, committed by the Army of Republika Srpska on 2 August 1992. 26 people were killed, with the oldest victim being 92-year old Hanka Halilović. The entire village was also burned.

In 2011, the skeletal remains of 13 victims were recovered. That same year, a memorial plaque was erected in the village. The perpetrators were not found by then, although several Bosnian Serb paramilitaries were convicted for crimes in the wider Višegrad area.

== Demographics ==
According to the 1991 census, it had a population of 78 people.
