= Serdari massacre =

Bosnian War mass killing

- Location: Serdari, near Kotor Varoš, Bosnia and Herzegovina
- Date: 17 September 1992
- Target: Bosnian Serbs
- Attack type: Mass killing
- Deaths: 16
- Perpetrator: Army of the Republic of Bosnia and Herzegovina (ARBiH) forces

The Serdari massacre was the mass murder of 16 Bosnian Serb civilians by the Army of the Republic of Bosnia and Herzegovina (ARBiH) on 17 September 1992 in the village of Serdari, near Kotor Varoš, during the Bosnian War.

On 17 September 1992, members of the Territorial Defence Force of the Republic of Bosnia and Herzegovina of Kotor Varoš operating in the village of Serdari killed Bosnian Serb civilians, using rifles and hand grenades. In January 2014, four ex-members of the Kotor Varoš TO forces were jailed for a total of 43 years for their role in the massacre. Fikret Planincic and Sead Menzil were sentenced to 11 1/2 years in prison, Mirsad Vatrac to ten and a half years, and Rasim Lisancic to nine and a half years.

According to the trial's findings, Planincic arrived at the house of a man called Jelenko Serdar in the morning with other fighters and killed nine victims inside. One of the key witnesses was a villager who had observed the attack and identified Planincic from a photo album. Planincic, Menzil and Vatrac were acquitted of taking part in the killings of seven more civilians at another villager's house on the same day. Among the victims were two children.

In February 2016, the Bosnian state court's appeals chamber upheld Planincic's 11-year prison sentence while acquitting Menzil and Vratac. Lisancic had since died. In July of that same year, an Austrian court in Linz sentenced another Bosniak man who had Austrian citizenship, to 10 years in prison for his participation in the massacre.
