= Duša killings =

1993 massacre of Bosniaks in Duša, Gornji Vakuf

- Part of Bosnian War
- Location of Duša in central Bosnia
- Location: 43°56′N 17°34′E; Duša, Gornji Vakuf, Bosnia and Herzegovina
- Date: 18 January 1993 (Central European Time)
- Target: Bosniaks
- Attack type: Mortar attack
- Deaths: 7
- Perpetrator: Croatian Defence Council (HVO)

On 18 January 1993, the village of Duša, Gornji Vakuf, was shelled by the Croatian Defence Council (HVO), and 7 Bosniak civilians were killed. Muslim homes were burnt down after the HVO took control of the village.

== Background ==
Gornji Vakuf is a town to the south of the Lašva Valley, with a population of about 10,000 Croats and 14,000 Muslims. On 11 January 1993, the first clashes between the Croatian Defence Council (HVO) and the Army of the Republic of Bosnia and Herzegovina (ARBiH) took place. There are conflicting reports as to how the fighting started and what caused it: a bomb placed in a Muslim owned hotel used as a headquarters, or an all-out attack by ARBiH forces on HVO positions.

On 16 January 1993, the HVO demanded that the ARBiH in Gornji Vakuf subordinate its troops to the HVO, which was rejected. On 18 January, the HVO attacked ARBiH positions in Gornji Vakuf.

== Attack on Duša ==
On 18 January, the HVO attacked the ARBiH in the village of Duša, Gornji Vakuf. Civilians, including elderly people, women and children, took shelter in the house of Enver Šljivo during the combat. During the attack, the HVO artillery fired several shells from a nearby village, one of which hit the home of Enver Šviljo and killed 7 civilians, including three children, three women, and an older man who died as a result of his wounds. The shelling damaged many Muslim houses.

After the ARBiH surrendered, the women, children, elderly and handicapped people were sent to the nearby village of Paloč, where a doctor examined the wounded and sent the seriously injured to a hospital in Bugojno. Others remained in Paloč for several days until the UNPROFOR moved them. There is no evidence about the detention conditions in Paloč. After the takeover of the village, HVO soldiers set fire to an unknown number of houses. Muslim men from Duša were transferred from Paloč to Trnovača and detained in a furniture factory. They were exchanged for prisoners taken by the ARBiH two weeks later.

== See also ==
- Croat-Muslim War
- List of massacres of Bosnian Muslims
