= Cerska =

Cerska Церска
- Village
- Location within Bosnia and Herzegovina
- Coordinates: 44°09′00″N 19°01′12″E
- Country: Bosnia
- Entity: Republika Srpska

Population (1991)
  - Total: 1,409
- Time zone: UTC+1 (CET)
  - Summer (DST): UTC+2 (CEST)

Cerska (Serbian Cyrillic: Церска) is a small town in the municipality of Vlasenica, Bosnia and Herzegovina located 12 kilometers from the town of Vlasenica itself and 11 km from the Serbian border. According to the 1991 census, Cerska had a total population of 1,409, of whom 99% were Bosniaks and the remainder Serbs and Yugoslavs.

During the 1992-1995 war in Bosnia and Herzegovina the village found itself in the Srebrenica enclave. However, in early March 1993 the Bosnian Serb Army overran Cerska and the neighboring village of Velići, killing from dozens to as many as 250 Bosniaks, and expelling the population west to Tuzla and east to Srebrenica.
