= Trusina massacre =

1993 mass killing during the Croat–Bosniak War

- Location: Trusina, Bosnia and Herzegovina
- Date: 16 April 1993 (Central European Time)
- Target: Croats
- Attack type: Mass murder
- Deaths: 22
- Perpetrator: Army of the Republic of Bosnia and Herzegovina (ARBiH)

The Trusina massacre occurred on 16 April 1993 in the village of Trusina, located in the municipality of Konjic in Bosnia and Herzegovina, where 22 people, six Croat prisoners of war and 16 Croat civilians, were killed by the Army of the Republic of Bosnia and Herzegovina (ARBiH) during the Croat–Bosniak War.

== Background ==
Location of Trusina in Bosnia and Herzegovina

On 16 April 1993, between 8 and 9am, an engagement between the Army of the Republic of Bosnia and Herzegovina (ARBiH) and the forces of the Croatian Defense Council began. After the first few hours of the battle, ARBiH troops broke the Croatian defense, and captured Croat soldiers. Eighteen civilians, including two children, and four captured Croat fighters were killed in various locations during and/or after the battle. The remaining civilians, mostly women and children were detained in several private houses, and later released from the village.

== Trials ==
The Prosecution of Bosnia and Herzegovina charged six members of the Bosnian army's "Zulfikar" special battalion including Mensur Memić, Dževad Salčin, Nedžad Hodžić, Senad Hakalović, Nihad Bojadžić and Zulfikar Ališpago for the murder of 22 people, including four HVO members and 18 civilians. Two other suspects, Edin Džeko and Rasema Handanović were extradited from the US for their alleged involvement, having been denaturalized and stripped of their US citizenship after their role in the massacre became known to US authorities.

In April 2012, Rasema Handanović pleaded guilty to killing Croat civilians and prisoners of war, expressing "deep regret" for her actions. She was sentenced to five and a half years imprisonment after she agreed to testify against the "Zulfikar" unit members in a plea bargain.

In September 2015, Memić, Hodžić, and Bojadžić were found guilty of killing of prisoners of war and civilians during a "preplanned and prepared attack against the Croat population of the village of Trusina". The trial verdict was upheld in January 2017.

In 2017, the UDIK published a book of verdicts for crimes in Trusina.
