= Zaklopača massacre =

Genocide of Bosniaks by the Bosnian Serb Army

Coordinates: 44°10′13″N 19°00′42″E

- Location: Zaklopača, Bosnia and Herzegovina, Milići, Bosnia and Herzegovina
- Date: 16 May 1992
- Target: Bosniaks
- Deaths: 63-83
- Perpetrator: Serb forces

The Zaklopača massacre occurred three years before the Srebrenica massacre, at the time when Serb forces were committing a campaign of ethnic cleansing of the Bosniak civilians in the Srebrenica region. According to Helsinki Watch at least 83 Bosniaks were killed, including 11 children and 16 elderly persons. According to the Institute for the Research of Genocide, Canada:

On 16 May 1992, Serb forces approached the village and demanded Bosniak residents to hand over their weapons. Except few hunting rifles, Bosniak residents did not have any combat weapons to defend themselves. When the Serbs learned that the residents were effectively unarmed, they blocked all exists of the village and massacred at least 63 Bosniak men, women and children.

== Court Proceedings ==
According to the trial judgement of Momčilo Krajišnik:

On 16 May 1992, Serb forces killed approximately 80 people in Zaklopača. A large number of Muslims were transferred to and detained at Sušica camp, where about 2,000 to 2,500 Muslims of both genders and all ages passed through during the period of June to September 1992. Detainees at Sušica performed forced labour, sometimes at the front lines. Some detainees were killed by camp guards or died from mistreatment. A massacre was committed during the night of 30 September 1992, when the remaining 140 to 150 detainees at Sušica camp were driven out of the camp with buses and executed.

The Zaklopača massacre is also one of events discussed in charges against Radovan Karadžić:

The Chamber is also satisfied that the proposed evidence of Mersudina Saim-Hodzic is relevant to the charges of genocide (Count 1), persecutions (Count 3), extermination (Count 4), murder (Counts 5 and 6), deportation (Count 7), and inhumane acts (forcible transfer) (Count 8), as it specifically relates to the attack against Zaklopaca, the imposition and maintenance of restrictive and discriminatory measures against the Bosnian Muslim population in Vlasenica municipality, the expulsion of Bosnian Muslims from Vlasenica municipality, and the killing of Bosnian Muslims in Zaklopaca.

The massacre Bosniak civilians at Zaklopača was also discussed in the Naser Orić case.
