= Biljani massacre =

1992 killing of civilians in Bosnia

- Biljani massacre (Bosnia and Herzegovina)
- Location: 44°35′00″N 16°47′00″E; Biljani, Republic of Bosnia and Herzegovina
- Date: 10 July 1992
- Target: Bosniak civilians
- Attack type: Mass killing and ethnic cleansing
- Deaths: ~260
- Perpetrators: 17th Light Infantry Brigade and police forces of the Army of Republika Srpska

Biljani massacre was the mass murder of approximately 260 Bosniak civilians carried out by the Army of the Republika Srpska (VRS) in the Bosniak village of Biljani in the municipality of Ključ on 10 July 1992.

The attack on the civilian population was reportedly the result of implementation of the "Instructions on the Organization and Activities of the Organs of the Serbian People in BiH in Emergency Circumstances" of 19 December 1991 issued by the Serb Democratic Party (SDS) Main Board, and included the order of the Crisis Staff of the Ključ Municipality of 27–28 May 1992, which prohibited leaving or entering the municipality.

The attack on the village began in the morning hours of 10 July 1992, led by the 17th Light Infantry Brigade of the VRS in cooperation with reserve and active police officers of the Police Department.

After entering the village, Serbian forces ordered the civilian population in the Brkići hamlet to leave their homes, after which they separated women and children from the men. The men were taken to the primary school in Biljani, where they were detained, and then taken out in groups of five to ten and killed. One group of men was tortured and then taken to the Lanište area, where the killings continued.

A total of 239 bodies of Bosniaks from Biljani Donji, Brkići, Osmanovići, Domazeti, Džaferagići, Čehići, Mešani and Jabukovci have been exhumed at the Lanište I, Crvena Zemlja I and II sites, as well as the Biljani grave.

In March 2005, the Court of Bosnia and Herzegovina raised an indictment for these crimes against Marko Samardžija, who as commander of the Third Company of the Sanica Battalion of the VRS ordered and participated in the massacre.

On 3 November 2006, Marko Samardžija was sentenced to 26 years in prison for crimes against humanity; the verdict confirmed the allegations regarding the mass killings of Bosniak civilians.
