= Pirići, Vitez =

Pirići
- Village
- Location within Bosnia and Herzegovina
- Coordinates: 44.1536204°N 17.8236546°E
- Country: Bosnia and Herzegovina
- Entity: Federation of Bosnia and Herzegovina
- Canton: Central Bosnia
- Municipality: Vitez

Area
  - Total: 0.30 sq mi (0.77 km^{2})

Population (2013)
  - Total: 165
  - Density: 550/sq mi (210/km^{2})
- Time zone: UTC+1 (CET)
  - Summer (DST): UTC+2 (CEST)

'Pirići is a village in the municipality of Vitez, Bosnia and Herzegovina.

== Demographics ==
According to the 2013 census, its population was 165.

Ethnicity in 2013
Ethnicity	Number	Percentage
Croats	80	48.5%
Bosniaks	74	44.8%
Serbs	2	1.2%
other/undeclared	9	5.5%
Total	165	100%
