= Trusina, Konjic =

Trusina Трусина
- Village
- Location within Bosnia and Herzegovina
- Coordinates: 43°44′N 17°50′E
- Country: Bosnia and Herzegovina
- Entity: Federation of Bosnia and Herzegovina
- Canton: Herzegovina-Neretva
- Municipality: Konjic

Area
  - Total: 0.52 sq mi (1.35 km^{2})

Population (2013)
  - Total: 143
  - Density: 274/sq mi (106/km^{2})
- Time zone: UTC+1 (CET)
  - Summer (DST): UTC+2 (CEST)

Trusina (Cyrillic: Трусина) is a village in the municipality of Konjic, Bosnia and Herzegovina.

== History ==
On 16 April 1993, the village was the site of the Trusina massacre, in which twenty-two Bosnian Croats were killed by the Army of the Republic of Bosnia and Herzegovina.

== Demographics ==
According to the 2013 census, its population was 143.

Ethnicity in 2013
Ethnicity	Number	Percentage
Bosniaks	139	97.2%
other/undeclared	4	2.8%
Total	143	100%
