= Raštani, Mostar =

Suburb in Bosnia and Herzegovina

Raštani
- Suburb
- Location within Bosnia and Herzegovina
- Coordinates: 43.371°N 17.835°E
- Country: Bosnia and Herzegovina
- Entity: Federation of Bosnia and Herzegovina
- Canton: Herzegovina-Neretva
- Municipality: City of Mostar

Area
  - Total: 4.59 sq mi (11.88 km^{2})

Population (2013)
  - Total: 1,442
  - Density: 314.4/sq mi (121.4/km^{2})
- Time zone: UTC+1 (CET)
  - Summer (DST): UTC+2 (CEST)
- Postal code: 88000 (Same as Mostar)
- Area code: (+387) 36 345

Raštani is a village in the City of Mostar, Bosnia and Herzegovina.

== Demographics ==
According to the 2013 census, its population was 1,442.

Ethnicity in 2013
Ethnicity	Number	Percentage
Croats	1,004	69.6%
Bosniaks	255	17.7%
Serbs	173	12.0%
other/undeclared	10	0.7%
Total	1,442	100%
