= Oborci =

- Village
- Location within Bosnia and Herzegovina
- Coordinates: 44°12′N 17°25′E
- Country: Bosnia and Herzegovina
- Entity: Federation of Bosnia and Herzegovina
- Canton: Central Bosnia
- Municipality: Donji Vakuf

Area
  - Total: 1.93 sq mi (5.00 km^{2})

Population (2013)
  - Total: 607
  - Density: 314/sq mi (121/km^{2})
- Time zone: UTC+1 (CET)
  - Summer (DST): UTC+2 (CEST)

Oborci is a village in the municipality of Donji Vakuf, Bosnia and Herzegovina. In Oborci of elementary school called "Third Oborci Elementary School."

- Oborci Place is situated in the foothills of the mountains Komar Sovic of Travnik on the road to Donji Vakuf. Location: G. latitude: 44 ° 11 '41 N; G. longitude: 17 ° 25' E. Most of the 9 areas Oborci is extremely hilly. The climate of the area is continental Oboraca - mountain. During the year, the temperature ranges from -20 degrees C to +35 degrees C, with distinct seasons. Plentiful rainfall in the spring and autumn months, and according to official figures ranging from 900 litres to 950 litres per square metre.
- Late Roman basilica in Oborci declared a national monument of Bosnia and Herzegovina 26 January 2004. year .. In the village along the main road Oborci Travnik - Lower Vakuf are the remains of Late Roman basilica. The basilica was built in the mount (Crkvina) a small hill in the midst of the village. It served as a village worship. Due to numerous devastation (of a treasure hunt (!) To individual construction), the remains of the basilica were barely visible, but still bear witness to the settlement developed in the late Roman period.

== History ==
On September 13, 1995, Bosnian Serb soldiers executed 28 Bosniak and Croat civilians near the Oborci railway station.

== Demographics ==
According to the 2013 census, its population was 607.

Ethnicity in 2013
Ethnicity	Number	Percentage
Bosniaks	599	98.7%
Serbs	1	0.2%
other/undeclared	7	1.2%
Total	607	100%
