= Duša =

- Village
- Location within Bosnia and Herzegovina
- Coordinates: 43°56′N 17°34′E
- Country: Bosnia and Herzegovina
- Entity: Federation of Bosnia and Herzegovina
- Canton: Central Bosnia
- Municipality: Gornji Vakuf-Uskoplje

Area
  - Total: 0.18 sq mi (0.46 km^{2})

Population (2013)
  - Total: 39
  - Density: 220/sq mi (85/km^{2})
- Time zone: UTC+1 (CET)
  - Summer (DST): UTC+2 (CEST)

Duša is a village in the municipality of Gornji Vakuf, Bosnia and Herzegovina.

== See also ==
- Duša killings

== Demographics ==
According to the 2013 census, its population was 39.

Ethnicity in 2013
Ethnicity	Number	Percentage
Bosniaks	31	79.5%
Croats	8	20.5%
Total	39	100%
