= Here, Prozor =

Here
- Village
- Location within Bosnia and Herzegovina
- Coordinates: 43.8283007°N 17.6362417°E
- Country: Bosnia and Herzegovina
- Entity: Federation of Bosnia and Herzegovina
- Canton: Herzegovina-Neretva
- Municipality: Prozor

Area
  - Total: 1.31 sq mi (3.40 km^{2})

Population (2013)
  - Total: 128
  - Density: 97.5/sq mi (37.6/km^{2})
- Time zone: UTC+1 (CET)
  - Summer (DST): UTC+2 (CEST)

Here is a village in the municipality of Prozor-Rama, Bosnia and Herzegovina.

== Demographics ==
According to the 2013 census, its population was 128, all Bosniaks.
