= Snagovo =

Snagovo Снагово
- Village
- Road sign on Crni vrh, pointing to Snagovo

- Location in Bosnia and Herzegovina
- Coordinates: 44°21′20″N 19°03′15″E
- Country: Bosnia and Herzegovina
- Entity: Republika Srpska
- Municipality: Zvornik
- Time zone: UTC+1 (CET)
  - Summer (DST): UTC+2 (CEST)

Snagovo (Serbian Cyrillic: Снагово) is a mountain village in the municipality of Zvornik, Bosnia and Herzegovina. It is divided into Gornje Snagovo (Upper Snagovo) and Donje Snagovo (Lower Snagovo).

== Bosnian War ==
Snagovo was among the hardest hit villages at the start of the Bosnian War in 1992. Between April and June 1992, Serb forces ethnically cleansed the village of its Bosniak (Muslim) residents.

=== 1992 massacre ===
The woods in the village, where the victims of the 1992 massacre were captured before being killed.

On 29 April 1992, a group of 36 Bosniak civilians were captured by Serbs hiding in the woods in Snagovo. They were killed, including children and pregnant women, and their corpses were burned in an effort to destroy evidence. Several days later, the victims' relatives found the burned remains and buried them nearby. Serbian Major Zoran Janković went on trial for the massacre but was acquitted on 19 June 2007 due to lack of evidence.

=== Srebrenica Genocide mass graves ===
Seven mass grave, containing the skeletal remains of 156 individuals, victims of the July 1995 Srebrenica Genocide, were uncovered in Snagovo. The 156 victims were moved to the seven "secondary graves" in Snagovo from the original burial sites around Srebrenica to hide the traces of the atrocity.

=== 1995 massacre ===
Among other massacres, six more people were killed in the village on 22 July 1995.

== Settlements ==
Several smaller settlements exist within the village of Snagovo:

- Perunika
- Rašidov Han
