= Kuline prison =

Military prison in Šibenik, Croatia

- Military prison
- Location: Šibenik, Croatia
- Operated by: Croatian Army
- Operational: March 1992-1993
- Inmates: Serbs
- Number of inmates: ca. 25
- Killed: Unknown

The Kuline prison was a military prison, operational from March 1992 to 1993, where Serb POWs and civilians were held during the Croatian War of Independence and subjected to abuse and torture.

On 2 March 1992, the Croatian Army (HVO) captured 21 Serbian Krajina Army POWs from the village of Nos Kalik and took them to the prison. In May 1993, four Serb civilians were captured in a military operation near the town of Drniš and taken to the prison. The prisoners were subjected to beatings with rubber batons, rifle butts, electric cables and other instruments. Prosecutors stated that victims were "black" from contusions, and large amounts of salt was added to their meals so that they would be constantly thirsty. They were also tortured with electric shocks and forced to engage in sexual intercourse. One woman was repeatedly raped by guards and made to have sex with other prisoners. Former Special Police members Tvrtko Pašalić, Željko Maglov, Damir Boršić and Milorad Bajić were charged with war crimes for their roles in the prison. In 2017, Boršić, who was the warden of the prison and Miroslav Periša, of the 72nd Battalion of the Armed Forces were found guilty and sentenced to two years in prison by the County Court in Split. Members of the 72nd battalion were also responsible for crimes against Serbs at the Lora prison camp.
