= Zoran Vuković =

Bosnian Serb (born 1955)

Zoran Vuković (born 6 September 1955 in Brusna, Foča, Bosnia and Herzegovina) is a Bosnian Serb who was charged with crimes against humanity by the International Criminal Tribunal for the Former Yugoslavia (ICTY) for his actions in the city of Foča during the Bosnian War. During the course of the war he was in the same unit as convicted indictee Radomir Kovač.

He was arrested by SFOR on 23 December 1999 and charged with several counts of rape and torture, of which he was ultimately found guilty of two counts of each as war crimes and acquitted of the remainder and the crimes against humanity charges. He was sentenced to twelve years in prison on 22 February 2001. At his own request, he was tried along with Dragoljub Kunarac and Radomir Kovač. He served his sentence in Bodø, Norway and was released on 11 March 2008, after serving about two thirds of the sentence.

== Links ==
- ICTY Redacted Indictment
- ICTY Judgement
