= Foča ethnic cleansing =

1992–94 series of killings in Foča, Bosnia and Herzegovina

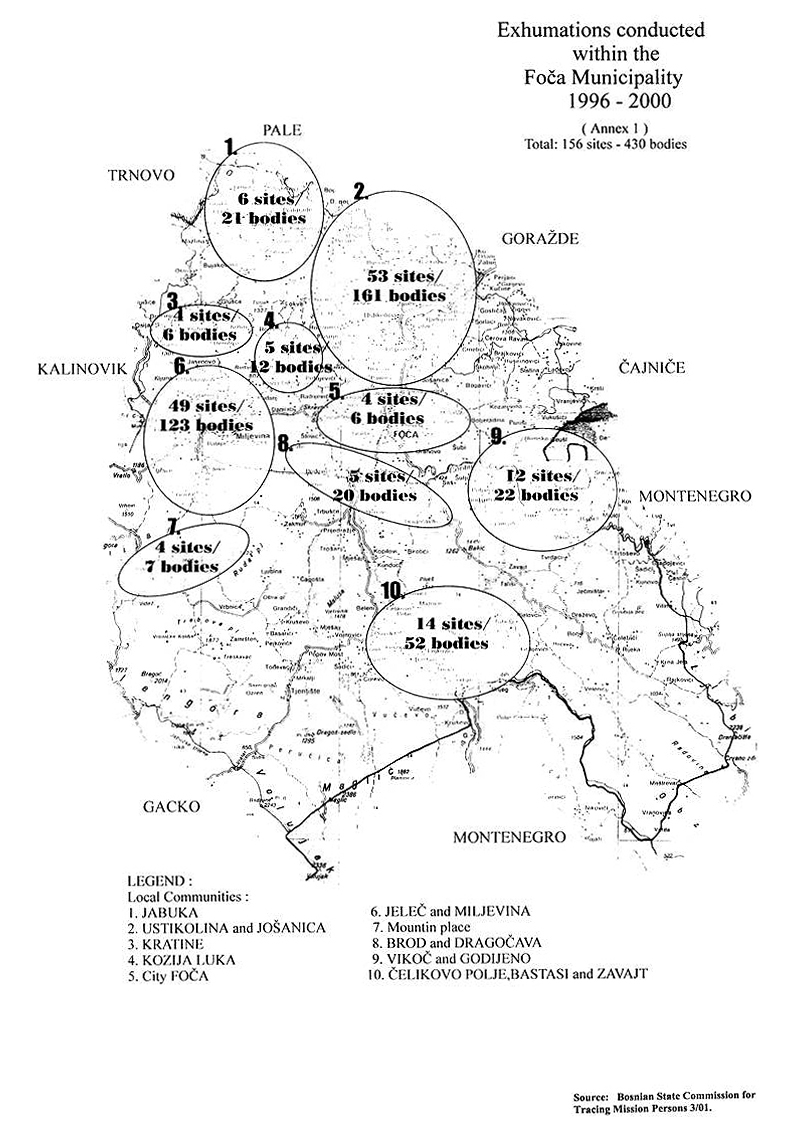
- Chart showing exhumations carried out between 1996 and 2000 in the Foča municipality, Bosnia and Herzegovina (Image provided courtesy of the ICTY)

- Foča (Bosnia and Herzegovina)
- Location: Foča, Bosnia and Herzegovina
- Date: 7 April 1992 to January 1994
- Target: Bosniaks
- Attack type: Genocide, ethnic cleansing, population transfer, genocidal rape
- Deaths: 2,707
- Perpetrator: Serb forces
- Motive: Anti-Bosniak sentiment, Serbianisation, Greater Serbia

There was a campaign of ethnic cleansing in the area of the town of Foča committed by Serb military, police, and paramilitary forces on Bosniak civilians from 7 April 1992 to January 1994 during the Bosnian War. By one estimate, around 21,000 non-Serbs left Foča after July 1992.

In numerous verdicts, the International Criminal Tribunal for the former Yugoslavia (ICTY) ruled that the ethnic cleansing (all Bosniaks were expelled), killings, mass rapes, and the deliberate destruction of Bosniak property and cultural sites constituted crimes against humanity. According to the Research and Documentation Center (IDC), 2,707 people were killed or went missing in the Foča municipality during the war. Among them were 1,513 Bosniak civilians and 155 Serb civilians. Additionally, Bosnian Serb authorities set up locations, commonly described as rape camps, in which hundreds of women were raped. Numerous Serb officers, soldiers and other participants in the Foča massacres were accused and convicted of war crimes by the ICTY.

== Attack against the civilian population ==
At the outset of the Bosnian War, Serb forces attacked the non-Serb civilian population in Eastern Bosnia. Once towns and villages were securely in their hands, Serb forces—i.e. the military, the police, the paramilitaries and, sometimes, even Serb villagers—applied the same pattern: Bosniak houses and apartments were systematically ransacked or burnt down while Bosniak civilians were rounded up or captured and, sometimes, beaten or killed in the process. Men and women were separated, with many of the men detained in local camps.

The Republika Srpska authorities held some Bosniaks in concentration camps in Foča before they were systematically executed.

Thirteen mosques including the Aladža Mosque were destroyed and the 22,500 Bosniaks who made up the majority of inhabitants fled. Only about 10 Bosniaks remained at the end of the conflict. In January 1994, the Serb authorities renamed Foča "Srbinje" (Serbian: Србиње), meaning "place of the Serbs" (from Srbi Serbs and -nje which is a Slavic locative suffix). In 2004, the Constitutional Court of Bosnia and Herzegovina declared the name change unconstitutional, and reverted it back to Foča.

Those that managed to escape the ethnic cleansing settled in the city of Rožaje until the war ended.

== Mass rapes ==
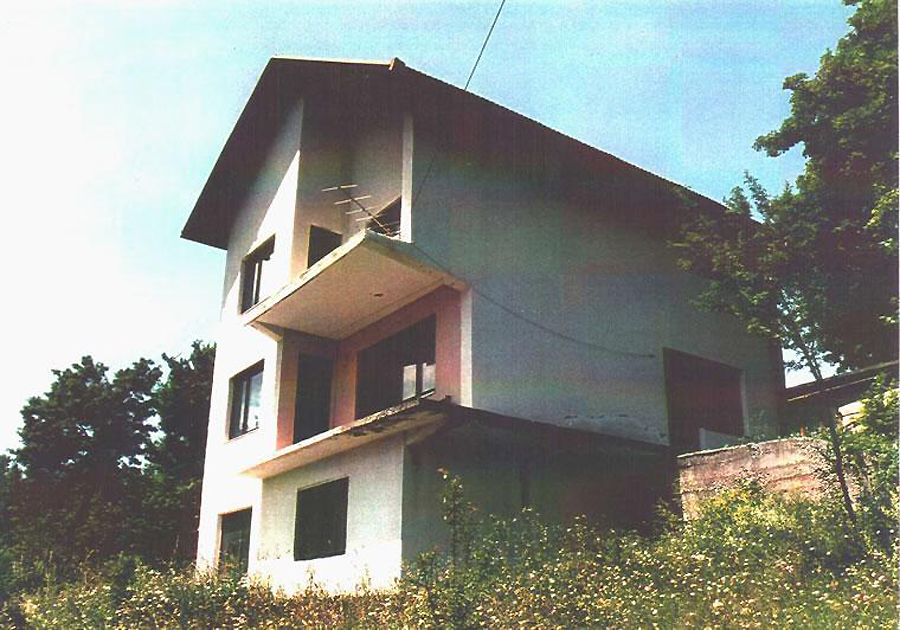
"Karaman's House", a location where women were tortured and raped near Foča (Photograph provided courtesy of the ICTY)

Bosniak women were kept in various detention centres where they lived in unhygienic conditions and were mistreated in many ways, including being repeatedly raped. Serbian soldiers or policemen would come to these detention centres, select one or more women, take them out and rape them. All this was done in full view, in complete knowledge and often with the direct involvement of the Serbian local authorities, particularly the police forces. The head of Foča police forces, Dragan Gagović, was personally identified as one of the men who came to these detention centres to take women out and rape them. There were numerous rape camps in Foča. "Karaman's house" was one of the most notorious rape camps. The women kept in this house were raped repeatedly. Among the women held in "Karaman's house" were minors as young as 12 years of age.

Bosniak women were raped by the Serbs as part of a methodical and concentrated campaign of ethnic cleansing. For instance, the girls and women selected by the later convicted war criminal Dragoljub Kunarac or by his men, were systematically taken to the soldiers' base, a house located in Osman Đikić street number 16. There, the women and girls (some as young as 14) were repeatedly raped. Serb soldiers regularly took Muslim girls from various detention centres and kept them as sex slaves.

Radomir Kovač, who was also convicted by ICTY, kept four Bosniak Muslim girls in his apartment, sexually abusing and repeatedly raping them. Kovač would also invite friends to his home and allow them to rape the girls. Kovač also sold three of the girls; prior to selling them, he gave two of the girls to other Serb soldiers who gang raped them for more than three weeks. The girls were then taken back to Kovač, who immediately sold one and gave the other away as a present to his friend.

== War crime trials ==
=== Convicted by the International Criminal Tribunal for the former Yugoslavia ===
The ICTY found that the Serb forces were guilty of persecutions, torture, murder, rape and enslavement (crimes against humanity) as well as cruel treatment (violations of law of war):

- Radovan Karadžić, former President of Republika Srpska, was sentenced to a life in prison.
- Dragoljub Kunarac (born 15 May 1960; 28 years in prison)
- Radomir Kovač (born 31 March 1961; 20 years in prison)
- Zoran Vuković (born 6 September 1955; 12 years in prison); granted early release after serving about two thirds of the sentence.
- Milorad Krnojelac (born 25 July 1940; 12 years in prison); granted early release on 9 July 2009 on the basis of credit given for the spent in detention since 15 June 1998.
- Dragan Zelenović (born 12 February 1961; 15 years in prison); granted early release on 28 August 2015 (effective 4 September 2015).
- Biljana Plavšić (11 years in prison; granted early release on 27 October 2009)
- Momčilo Krajišnik (20 years in prison; granted early release in September 2013)

Dragan Gagović and Janko Janjić were indicted by the ICTY but got killed by SFOR in 1999 and 2000, respectively.

=== Convicted by the Court of Bosnia and Herzegovina ===
- Radovan Stanković (20 years in prison; escaped from prison; recaptured five years later)
- Neđo Samardžić (24 years in prison)
- Gojko Janković (34 years in prison)
- Savo Todorović (12 years and 6 months in prison)
- Mitar Rašević (8 years and 6 months in prison)
- Radmilo Vuković was sentenced to five years and six months' imprisonment by the Court of Bosnia and Herzegovina; later acquitted upon appeal.

=== Acquitted by the Court of Bosnia and Herzegovina ===
- Momčilo Mandić was acquitted of all charges.

=== Convicted by the High Court in Podgorica ===
- Slobodan Pekovic (20 years in prison

== See also ==
- Bosnian genocide
- List of massacres in the Bosnian War
- Serbia in the Yugoslav Wars
- List of massacres of Bosniaks
- Gornja Jošanica massacre

== Books ==
- Blumenthal, David A.; McCormack, Timothy L. H. (2008). The Legacy of Nuremberg: Civilising Influence Or Institutionalised Vengeance? Volume 20 of International humanitarian law series. Martinus Nijhoff Publishers. ISBN 9789004156913.
