= Lora prison camp =

Prison camp in Split, Croatia

- Detainment camp
- Location: Split, Croatia
- Operated by: Croatian Army
- Operational: 1992-1997
- Inmates: Serbs
- Killed: 36+

The Lora prison camp was a prison camp in Split, Croatia. It was active from 1992 to 1997 with mainly Serbian residents of Split and prisoners of war being imprisoned throughout the Croatian War of Independence. The camp was the site of human rights abuses resulting in a controversial trial, acquittal, retrial and conviction of prison guards.

== Background ==
In 1991, during the Croatian War of Independence, Yugoslav Federal JNA forces were forced to withdraw from Split and the Lora naval compound was occupied by Croatian forces. The naval compound was converted to a prison camp in 1992 to house both civilians and prisoners of war.

== Treatment of prisoners ==
The camp prisoners were subjected to a variety of beating, torture and killings. Guards from the camp were sentenced for murdering and torturing prison inmates. Incidents of prison population being beaten with fists, boots, rubber hoses, batons, baseball bats, plumbing pipes, chains, electrical conductors, tortured by means of forcing of prisoners to eat live snails with the shell, to eat feathers of killed birds, orange peels, live frogs, worms; "Telephoning" – linking of certain parts of body of the prisoner: ears, sexual organs, temples, fingers of hands or toes, to the inducted electric current from the field telephone; forcing of prisoners to lick the toilet bowl and WC floor; forcing of prisoners to masturbate; hitting of prisoners on the testicles; forcing of prisoners to drink hot, muddy water with the spit of the prison guard; placing and tying of a metal barrel on the back of the prisoner and drumming on the barrel; hanging of the prisoner so that his hands are tied with cuff-links and suspended on metal bars of the doors; forcing of prisoners to drink urine; forcing of prisoners to have public sexual and in particular homosexual intercourse with each other; forcing of prisoner to eat half a kilogram of salt without any water; placing in the mouth of a prisoner of a pistol barrel with the threat of firing the pistol; forcing of prisoners to collect garbage in the prison camp courtyard with their mouths; "dancing kolo folk dance" – in the courtyard prisoners would form a circle, holding their hands, and the first one and the last one would be connected with electrodes on to the source of electric current; shaving of the prisoner without any water with a knife and forcing the prisoner to eat his own beard; forcing of prisoners to tend to grass or cut grass around the prison camp circle in the part which is covered with mines - appeared daily there, and it was one of the most notorious places of organized torture in present-day Croatia.

According to the Serb National Council, over 1,100 detainees were held in the camp throughout its existence. Non-governmental agencies who have investigated the camp state that at least "several dozen" were killed while former detainees claim over 60 are missing.

== Aftermath ==
In 1998, the Federal Republic of Yugoslavia filed a report to the United Nations regarding the Lora prison camp abuses claiming it was genocide.

== The trial ==
In 2002, the trial of eight Croatian military officers, members of the 72nd Military Police Battalion, began with charges of the torture and murder of Serbian and Montenegrin prisoners at the camp. All eight were acquitted by Judge Lozina in November 2002 after a trial characterised by intimidation and harassment of witnesses, and alleged threats against the prosecutors. The eight charged were prison commander Tomislav Duic, deputy Tonci Vrkic, members of the intervention group Miljenko Bajic, Josip Bikic and Davor Banic, and prison guards Bungur, Ante Gudic and Andjelko Botic.

All eight officers were retried with a verdict handed down by the Split Cantonal Court, War Crimes Chamber on March 2, 2006. The officers were all found guilty of war crimes and sentenced to between 4 and 8 years in prison although four of them (Duic, Bajic, Bikic and Bungur) were tried in absentia. Bikic and Bajic were later arrested and re-tried, being sentenced to four years and four and a half years in prison respectively.

Bungur was arrested in 2015 and Duic was captured in 2016. After a lengthy trial, in April 2022, the County Court of Split sentenced Duic to 8 and a half years and Bungur to 4 years and ten months. The verdict was criticized by former detainees for only taking into account the crimes committed at the camp between April and August 1992, and not the entire duration of the camp. In March 2023, Croatia’s High Criminal Court increased the sentences to Duic and Bungur to 10 and 8 years respectively.
