= Paklenik massacre =

1992 massacre of 48 Bosniaks by Army of the Republika Srpska

- Rogatica (Bosnia and Herzegovina)
- Location: 43°47′55″N 19°00′13″E; Rogatica, Bosnia and Herzegovina
- Date: 15 June 1992 (Central European Time)
- Target: Bosniaks
- Attack type: Mass Killing
- Deaths: 48
- Perpetrator: Republika Srpska Army

The Paklenik massacre is the massacre of 48 Bosniaks by the Army of the Republika Srpska in the Rogatica Municipality on 15 June 1992.

== Background ==
A day earlier to the incident, the Serb Democratic Party-led Višegrad Municipality organized a deportation of Bosniak civilians to Olovo, a town near Sarajevo. However, on its way towards the Rogatica Municipality, Bosnian Serb Army members from Višegrad stopped the buses and took all the men off to another bus. They spent the night in Rogatica and the next day they were taken to Paklenik (Hell) to a ravine called Propast (Downfall) where they were systematically executed and their bodies were thrown into the ravine. Only one man survived the massacre. The men responsible for this massacre have not yet answered for their crimes. The only people who have been indicted were Mitar Vasiljević, Nenad Tanasković, Sredoje and Milan Lukić. One man, Predrag Milisavljević, was arrested in Višegrad in June 2012, suspected of having taken part in the massacre. The Bosniak civilians who were deported and who were massacred came from the following villages in Višegrad: Gornji and Donji Dubovik, Veletovo, Žagre, Smriječje, Zupa and Dobrun.

The remains of these executed Bosniaks were found in 2000.

== See also ==
- Visegrad massacre
- List of massacres of Bosniaks
- Uzamnica camp
- Bosanska jagodina massacre
- Srebrenica massacre
- Bosnian genocide
- Višegrad
- Milan Lukić
- Mitar Vasiljević
- Nenad Tanasković
