= Bosanska Jagodina massacre =

1992 war crime

- Crnčići (Bosnia and Herzegovina)
- Location: 43°48′56″N 19°21′28″E; Crnčići, Bosnia and Herzegovina
- Date: 26 May 1992
- Target: Bosniaks
- Attack type: Mass killing and ethnic cleansing
- Deaths: 17
- Perpetrators: Serbs (Yellow Wasps, Army of the Republika Srpska)

The Bosanska Jagodina Massacre refers to the execution of 17 Bosniak civilians from Višegrad, all of them men, on 26 May 1992. This war crime was most probably carried out by Serbian paramilitary group "Avengers" led by Milan Lukić, under the control of the Army of Republika Srpska. In 2006 the remains of the murdered men were found in a mass grave in Crnčići near Bosanska Jagodina. According to the Commission for missing persons in Bosnia and Herzegovina, the executed civilians in the massacre that day included : Bajro Murtić, Ismail Račić, Hidajet Račić, Mirsad Veletovac, Kemal Maluhić, Sead Šuško, Midhat Kasapović, Abdulah Veletovac, Ahmet Kadrić, Esad Tabaković, Bajro Beširević, Mehmed Džagadurov, Hamed Zukić, and one person with the surname Kasapović from the village Žagre near Višegrad.

== See also ==
- Višegrad massacre
- List of massacres of Bosniaks
- Bosnian genocide
- Uzamnica camp
- Paklenik Massacre
- Srebrenica massacre
- Bosnian genocide
- Višegrad
- Željko Lelek
- Momir Savić
- Milan Lukić
- Mitar Vasiljević
- Nenad Tanasković
