= Radomir Šušnjar =

Bosnian war criminal

Radomir Radovan Šušnjar (born 1955 in Bosnia and Herzegovina) known as "Lalco", is a convicted Bosnian Serb war criminal who took part in the Pionirska Street fire on 14 June 1992 which killed 59 people.

== Bosnian War ==
Prior to the Bosnian War Susnjar worked in Višegrad as a delivery driver for a bakery.

During the Bosnian War Susnjar was accused of participating in the Pionirska Street fire which occurred on 14 June 1992. The massacre was an ethnic cleansing of the Drina Valley by the Bosnian Serbs. Over 60 Bosniak women, children and elderly men, most of them from the village of Koritnik, were forced in a house on Pionirska Street, Višegrad by cousins Milan and Sredoje Lukić. They were locked into one room of the house, which was then set on fire. Milan Lukić was found to have thrown an explosive device into the room, setting the house ablaze. 59 of the occupants died.

== Legal process ==
After months of investigation, Susnjar was arrested in France at the request of Bosnia and Herzegovina on 4 April 2014. He was later released and placed under court surveillance.

On 7 January 2015, French Appeals Court postponed its decision to extradite Susnjar until all requirements necessary for extradition were met. The court requested additional information and evidence regarding the events. Further information from the Bosnian authorities was requested on 3 June 2015.

On 13 April 2016 the Appeals Court ruled in favor of extraditing Susnjar. His counsel appealed the court's decision.

In June 2018, France extradited Susnjar to Bosnia to face charges for the war crimes which he allegedly took part.

On October 30 Court of Bosnia and Herzegovina sentenced him to 20 years in prison for a wartime massacre of 57 Bosniak civilians who were locked in a house and burned alive, including two children.
