= Višegrad massacres =

1992 mass murder of Bosniak civilians

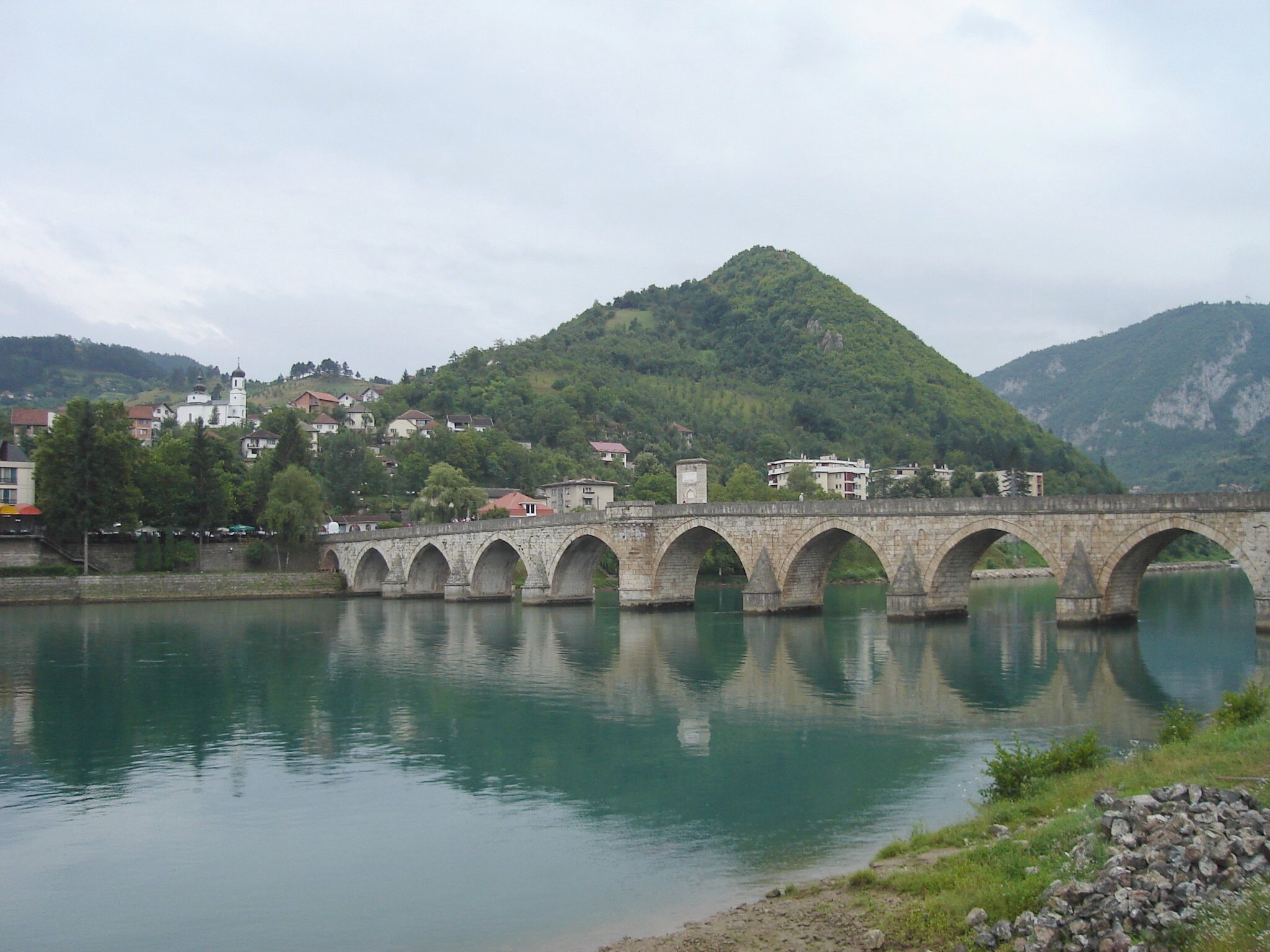
- 'The Bridge on the Drina', Mehmed Paša Sokolović Bridge, Višegrad, a place where many Bosnian Muslim civilians where slaughtered
- Location: 43°46′58″N 19°17′28″E; Višegrad, Bosnia and Herzegovina
- Date: 1992
- Target: Bosniaks
- Attack type: Ethnic cleansing, mass murder
- Deaths: 1,000 to 3,000
- Perpetrators: Army of the Republika Srpska, Višegrad Brigade, White Eagles paramilitary, Milan Lukić
- Motive: Anti-Bosniak sentiment, Serbianisation, Greater Serbia

The Višegrad massacres were acts of mass murder committed against the Bosniak civilian population of the town and municipality of Višegrad during the ethnic cleansing of eastern Bosnia by Republika Srpska police and military forces during the spring and summer of 1992, at the start of the Bosnian War.

According to documents of the International Criminal Tribunal for the former Yugoslavia (ICTY), based on the victims reports, some 3,000 Bosniaks were murdered during the violence in Višegrad and its surroundings, including some 600 women and 119 children. According to the ICTY, Višegrad was subjected to "one of the most comprehensive and ruthless campaigns of ethnic cleansing in the Bosnian conflict". According to the Research and Documentation Center in Sarajevo, 1,661 Bosniaks (both soldiers and civilians) were killed or missing in Višegrad.

The viciousness of the crimes of violence committed by the Army of Republika Srpska in the Višegrad massacres and the effectiveness with which the town's entire Bosniak population was either killed or deported by Republika Srpska forces in 1992, long before similar events in Srebrenica, have been described as epitomising the genocide of the Bosniak population of eastern Bosnia carried out on orders from the Bosnian Serb leader Radovan Karadžić and his military counterpart General Ratko Mladić.

== Massacres ==
On 6 April 1992, the Yugoslav People's Army (JNA) occupied Višegrad after several days of fighting. Upon seizing the town, they formed the Serbian Municipality of Višegrad and took control of all municipal government offices. On 19 May 1992, the JNA officially withdrew from the town. Soon thereafter, local Serbs, the police and paramilitaries began one of the most notorious campaigns of ethnic cleansing in the conflict, designed to permanently rid the town of its Bosniak population. The ruling Serb Democratic Party declared "Višegrad to be a Serb town'. All non-Serbs lost their jobs, and the murders began. Serb forces (sometimes referred to as the "White Eagles" and "Avengers" and associated with Vojislav Šešelj, leader of the Serbian ultra-nationalist Serbian Radical Party) attacked and destroyed a number of Bosniak villages. A large number of unarmed Bosniak civilians in the town of Višegrad were killed because of their ethnicity. Hundreds of Bosniaks were killed in random shootings.

Except for an apparently small number who escaped, all of the able-bodied Bosniak men and youths of Višegrad who had not fled the town were shot or otherwise killed, according to survivors. According to the 1991 Yugoslav census, Višegrad municipality had a population of about 21,000 before the conflict, 63% Bosniak and 33% Bosnian Serb.

Every day Bosniak men, women and children were killed on the Drina river bridge and their bodies were dumped into the river. Many of the Bosniak men and women were arrested and detained at various locations in the town. Army of Republika Srpska soldiers raped women and inflicted terror on civilians. Looting and destruction of Bosniak and Croat property occurred daily and mosques in Višegrad were destroyed. Army of Republika Srpska forces were also implicated in the widespread and systematic looting and destruction of Bosniak homes and villages. Both of the town's mosques were demolished. Many of the Bosniaks who were not immediately killed were detained at various locations in the town, as well as the former JNA military barracks at Uzamnica, 5 kilometres outside of Višegrad; some were detained in the hotel Vilina Vlas or other detention sites in the area. The Vilina Vlas hotel served as a brothel or rape camp. Bosniak women and girls, including many not yet 14 years old, were brought to the camp by police officers and members of the paramilitary groups the White Eagles and Arkan's and Šešelj's men.

=== Bridge murders ===
According to the survivors and the report submitted to UNHCR by the Bosnian government, the Drina river was used to dump many of the bodies of the Bosniak men, women and children who were killed around the town and on the famous Mehmed Paša Sokolović Bridge, as well as the new one. Day after day, truckloads of Bosniak civilians were taken down to the bridge and riverbank by Army of Republika Srpska paramilitaries, unloaded, shot, and thrown into the river.

On 10 June 1992, Milan Lukić entered the Varda factory and collected seven Bosniak men from their workstations. He thereafter took them down to the bank of the Drina river in front of the factory, where he lined them up. He then shot them in full view of a number of onlookers, including the wife and daughter of one of the victims, Ibrišim Memišević. All seven men were killed.

In a report submitted to the UNHCR in 1993 by the Government of Bosnia and Herzegovina, it was alleged that, on another occasion, during the murder of a group of 22 people on 18 June 1992, Lukić's group tore out the kidneys of several individuals, while the others were tied to cars and dragged through the streets; their children were thrown from the bridge and shot at before they hit the water.

In the summer of 2010, when the waters of Perućac Lake and the Drina upstream of the lake were lowered as a result of maintenance work on the Bajina Bašta dam, the remains of over 300 victims were retrieved for identification.

=== Pionirska Street fire and the Bikavac fire ===
In the Pionirska Street fire, on 14 June 1992, a group of 70 Bosniak civilians, mainly from the village of Koritnik, were locked en masse in a house on Pionirska Street, Višegrad. Some of the women were taken out and raped before being returned to the house. A grenade was then thrown inside, killing some. The house was then set ablaze and the occupants were left to burn to death. 59 people were killed but a small number of others survived. All of the survivors who were still alive at the time testified before the ICTY Trial Chamber at the trial of Lukić's cousins.

In the Bikavac fire on 27 June 1992, approximately 70 Bosniak civilians were forced into one room in a house in the settlement of Bikavac, near Višegrad. After the captives were robbed, the house was set on fire and the occupants were burned alive. The Trial Chamber found that at least 60 Bosniak civilians were killed. Zehra Turjačanin testified in relation to this incident:

'There were many children in that house, it's so sad', the witness said adding that the youngest child there was less than one year old. Most of the people were younger women with children, and there were some elderly men and women too. The Serb soldiers first threw stones at windows to break them, and then lobbed hand grenades. For a while, they fired shots at the crowd inside the house and they set the house on fire. 'People were burned alive, everybody was crying out; I simply can't describe what I heard then', the witness said. When the fire caught her clothes the witness and one of her sisters managed to get to the door, but it was blocked: a heavy iron garage door had been placed against it from the outside. However, she was able to somehow pull herself out through a small opening in the door; her sister remained inside. As she ran towards the houses in the Mejdan neighborhood, the witness saw Serb soldiers lying in the grass and drinking.

=== Paklenik massacre ===
On 14 June 1992, dozens of Bosniak men were separated from an organized civilian convoy leaving Višegrad and were systematically executed the next day by soldiers from the Republika Srpska army's Višegrad Brigade, in what came to be known as the Paklenik Massacre. Around 50 Bosniak civilians were shot and their bodies were dumped in a ravine called Propast (Downfall). The sole survivor, Ferid Spahić, was a key witness in the Mitar Vasiljević and Nenad Tanasković cases.

=== Bosanska Jagodina massacre ===
On 26 May 1992, the SDS-led Municipality organized buses to deport Bosniaks from Višegrad to Macedonia. Near Bosanska Jagodina, 17 male Bosniaks were taken off the bus and murdered in front of eyewitnesses in what is known as the Bosanska Jagodina massacre. Their remains were discovered in a mass grave in 2006. It is believed that this war crime was most probably carried out by the paramilitary group the "Avengers" led by Milan Lukić, under the control of the Army of the Republika Srpska.

=== Barimo Massacre ===
In August 1992, the Army of the Republika Srpska attacked Barimo, burnt down the entire village and religious buildings. A total of 26 Bosniak civilians were killed. A large number of them were women and children. The oldest victim was Halilović Hanka, born in 1900 and the youngest was Bajrić Fadila Emir, born in 1980.

=== Perućac Lake exhumations ===
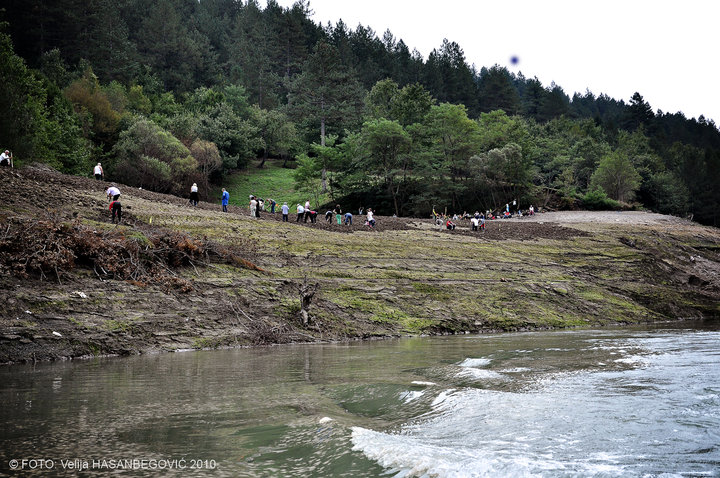
Volunteers searching for human remains at Lake Perućac, 19 October 2010

In July and August 2010, when the level of the Perućac reservoir water behind the Bajina Bašta hydroelectric dam was lowered while maintenance and repair work was being done on the dam, the remains of many civilians who perished in the Višegrad massacres in 1992, in the early days of the Bosnian war, were discovered. The bodies of victims from the 1999 Kosovo conflict are also thought to be in the lake.

Between 19 July and 9 August 2010, the remains of 60 individuals were found in Lake Perućac. Amor Mašović, Chairman of the Bosnian Institute for Missing Persons, who was in charge of forensic investigations at the lake, believed that they had all been killed in Višegrad or a few kilometres further upstream in Muhići and Kurtalići, and their bodies thrown into the Drina. When the bodies reached the lake, they were snagged by branches or became stuck in the shallow mud and sand.

Divers also searched for bodies of Kosovar Albanians from the refrigerator truck dumped in the lake in 1999. Although dozens of bodies were recovered from the truck when it was discovered in 2003, more are thought to be in the lake, as the vehicle's doors were open when it was found.

Representatives of missing persons commissions from Serbia and Kosovo joined the Institute team in conducting a joint examination of an eight-kilometre stretch of the lake. The institute's team members were shot at from the village of Blace, near Višegrad, about 10 days after they began the search.

The remains of at least three German Wehrmacht soldiers from World War II were also discovered during the 2010 investigations.

Amor Mašović believed there were over 2,000 bodies in the lake, making it "the largest mass grave in Europe." As of 23 September 2010 remains of 373 bodies, believed to be mostly those of victims of the Višegrad massacres, had been retrieved from the reservoir, which was due to commence refilling on 26 September.

Many volunteers joined the official teams searching for the bodies, but the Serbian authorities, criticized by Mašović for hampering the work, were insistent that the dam be brought back into service and refilled before the recovery work was complete.

On 26 October 2010, Mašović told a press conference in Sarajevo that 396 "cases" had been discovered during the two-and-a-half-month investigation. He used the term "cases" rather than "victims" because, in some instances, only a bone, leg, arm, or rib had been found, not a complete skeleton. However, he believed that between 97 and 120 victims might be identified after forensic analysis of the remains. These included six Austro-Hungarian soldiers from World War I, but most were Bosniaks from Višegrad. Mašović noted that at least 800 people were still missing from Višegrad since the 1992-95 war. Veljko Odalović, head of the Serbian Commission for Missing Persons, told the press conference that discovering the fate of 14,500 victims of war listed as missing in the former Yugoslavia was a "civilization and humanitarian" issue and a precondition for reconciliation and the stabilization of relations.

== Eliticide ==
Eliticide is defined as the systematic killing of a community's political and economic leadership so that the community cannot regenerate. After the Yugoslav People's Army occupied Višegrad, the Serb Crisis Committee ("krizni stab" led by the Serb Democratic Party) took control of the municipality. Leading Bosniak intellectuals, political leaders and activists, members of the Islamic Religious Community (Islamska Vjerska Zajednica) and police officers were expelled from work, arrested, jailed, called for "informative talks", or kept under house arrest. Republika Srpska police officials gave Serb paramilitary groups lists of Bosniaks who possessed firearms. The paramilitary groups then went individually man to man and asked them to turn in their firearms. Bosniak intellectuals were systematically murdered.

== Trials ==
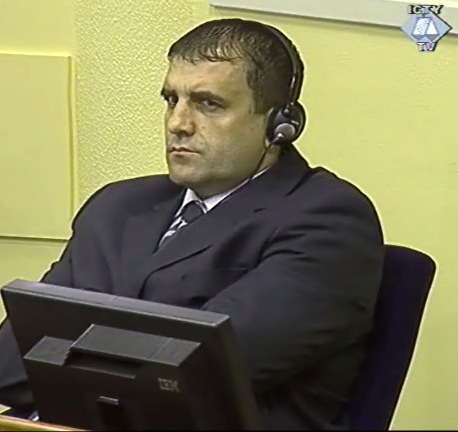
Milan Lukić before the ICTY in The Hague, 2009 (Photograph provided courtesy of the ICTY)

In 1996, Milan Lukić, his cousin Sredoje Lukić and Mitar Vasiljević were indicted by the International Criminal Tribunal for the former Yugoslavia in The Hague for persecution's as a crime against humanity and the "extermination of a significant number of civilians, including women, children and the elderly." In his sentence the tribunal concluded that Lukić and his troops may have killed thousands of people in the period between 1992 and 1993.

Dragutin Dragićević is serving a 20-year sentence, Đorđe Šević was convicted to 15 years, while two others were sentences to 20 years in absentia, Milan Lukić, who was in the meanwhile arrested and extradited to the Hague Tribunal and Oliver Krsmanović, remains a fugitive. The Hague Tribunal sentenced Mitar Vasiljević to 15 years for crimes against humanity. The International Criminal Tribunal for the former Yugoslavia and the Court of Bosnia and Herzegovina has processed the following for war crimes in Višegrad:

- Milan Lukić (Life)
- Sredoje Lukić (30 years, 27 years upon appeal)
- Mitar Vasiljević (20 years, 15 years upon appeal)
- Boban Šimšić (14 years)
- Željko Lelek (13 years)
- Momir Savić (18 years)
- Nenad Tanasković (12 years, 8 years upon appeal)
- Novo Rajak (14 years)
- Oliver Krsmanović (charged)

== In popular culture and media ==
An account of the massacre is depicted in the journalistic comic Safe Area Goražde by Joe Sacco.

In 2013 Bosnian film director and screenwriter Jasmila Žbanić made a feature film For Those Who Can Tell No Tales subjecting Višegrad massacres.

On 11 August 2005, journalist Ed Vulliamy described the situation of Višegrad in The Guardian:

For centuries, although wars had crisscrossed the Drina, Višegrad has remained a town two-thirds Bosnian Muslim and one-third Bosnian Serb. The communities entwined, few caring who was what. But in the spring of 1992, a hurricane of violence was unleashed by Bosnian Serbs against their Muslim neighbors in Višegrad, with similar attacks along the Drina valley and other parts of Bosnia. Visegrad is one of hundreds of forgotten names [...] As elsewhere, the pogrom was carried out on orders from the Bosnian Serb leader Radovan Karadic and his military counterpart General Ratko Mladić, both still wanted for genocide.

On 8 February 2008, American Congressman John Olver, called for the remembrance of genocide in Bosnia and Herzegovina and specially paid attention the war crimes in Visegrad:

As we commemorate the 13th anniversary of the Srebrenica genocide, perpetrated by nationalist Serb forces predominantly against Bosniaks, Bosnian Muslims, it is time to pay tribute to the tragic episodes not only in Srebrenica, but also in other less-known places in Bosnia and Herzegovina. In the spring of 1992, a deliberate, centrally planned, and well-organized campaign of ethnic cleansing, mass murder, rape, torture, and intimidation terrorized the civilian population throughout Bosnia and Herzegovina and took the lives of 200,000 men, women, and children. Out of those, 8,000 perished in Srebrenica alone during a period of less than five days in July 1995. In the end, 2 million Bosnians were displaced from their homes, and the country's rich cultural and religious heritage and monuments were deliberately destroyed. Shattered state institutions remain dysfunctional from the chaos and are struggling to cope with the significant loss of Bosnia's population. Today, survivors are battling post-traumatic stress disorder, orphans are still searching for their parents' remains, and new mass graves continue to be discovered. The entire western Balkans region has still not fully recovered from the violent break-up of Yugoslavia. The human tragedy that befell Bosnia and its citizens in places less known such as Bihać, Žepa, Goražde, and Višegrad needs to be revisited and marked in its proper place in the memory of human experience and history. If the international community had possessed the will to protect the UN-designated "safe haven" of Srebrenica, it would have prevented the tragic outcome and thousands of innocent lives would have been with us here today. The world had said "never again" to genocide, only to abandon the people of Bosnia to an unspeakable nightmare. Today, let us remind ourselves of the consequences: Srebrenica was the worst single atrocity in Europe after World War II. We cannot pretend that Bosnia's struggles are simply in the past, nor that the country has fully stabilized. The people of Bosnia are still trying to rebuild their country, to reform the institutions that were responsible for the genocide, and to move beyond ethnoterritorial divisions into a functional democratic state. As we mark July 11th, we must always remember the innocent people who lost their lives while the international community failed to act. We must acknowledge that justice will prevail only when General Ratko Mladić and Radovan Karadžić are apprehended, and we must never forget the horrors that befell the people of Bosnia and Herzegovina.

== See also ==
- List of massacres in Bosnia and Herzegovina
- List of massacres of Bosniaks
- Bosnian genocide
