= Sjeverin massacre =

1992 atrocity in Bosnia

- Location: Near Višegrad, Bosnia and Herzegovina
- Date: 22 October 1992 (Central European Time)
- Target: Bosniaks
- Attack type: Mass killing
- Deaths: 16
- Perpetrator: White Eagles

The Sjeverin massacre was the massacre on 22 October 1992 of 16 Bosniak citizens of Serbia from the village of Sjeverin who had been abducted from a bus in the village of Mioče, in Bosnia. The abductees were taken to the Vilina Vlas hotel in Višegrad where they were tortured before being taken to the Drina River and executed. Members of a Serbian paramilitary unit commanded by Milan Lukić were convicted of the crime in 2002.

== Background ==
On the morning of 22 October 1992, a bus traveling from Rudo, Bosnia, to Priboj in the Sandžak area of Serbia by a route that first went through Sjeverin and then passed again through Bosnian territory, was stopped in the Bosnian village of Mioče by four members of the Osvetnici (Avengers) paramilitary unit under the command of Lukić. The other members of the group were Oliver Krsmanović, Dragutin Dragicević, and Đorđe Sević.

16 Bosniak passengers from Sjeverin - 15 men and one woman, all Yugoslavian and Serbian citizens - were taken off the bus and forced onto a truck. They were taken to Višegrad, in eastern Bosnia, which was under the control of the Bosnian Serb Army. Along the way, the prisoners were forced to sing Serbian nationalist songs. The truck stopped at the Vilina Vlas hotel in Višegrad. The hostages were severely beaten and tortured inside the hotel and then taken to the edge of the Drina River where they were executed.

The victims were Mehmed Šebo, Zafer Hadžić, Medo Hadžić, Medredin Hodžić, Ramiz Begović, Derviš Softić, Medhad Softić, Mujo Alihodžić, Alija Mandal, Sead Pecikoza, Mustafa Bajramović, Hajrudin Sajtarević, Esad Džihić, Ramahudin Ćatović, Idriz Gibović and Mevlida Koldžić. Their bodies have yet to be found.

== Investigation ==
The investigative documentary Abduction (Serbian: Отмица, director: Ivan Markov), produced by Veran Matić for TV B92 in 2002, reported the failure of the Yugoslav Federal and Serbian Governments to investigate the crime, determine the fate of the abductees and protect the other terrified inhabitants of Sjeverin.

Yugoslav Federal Minister for Human and Minority Rights Momčilo Grubač visited the area two days after the abduction. The local member of the Federal Parliament Zoran Ćirković called on Grubač to protest urgently to Radovan Karadžić, President of Republika Srpska at the time and later a convicted war criminal, and demand the perpetrators' extradition. Ćirković, a Serb, has emphasised that the abductees were ordinary citizens who were just local residents.

Ratko Mladić, Defense Minister of the Republika Srpska, was also present. He said that he knew nothing about the abduction, had come to see what was going on and say that the Army of Republika Srpska had nothing to do with it and would do everything in his power to help locate the abductees. Locals were subjected to further intimidation by Milan Lukić. Serbian President Slobodan Milošević refused to receive the missing persons' relatives while a special government committee set up by Yugoslav President Dobrica Ćosić came up with no further results. The remaining Bosniak inhabitants of Sjeverin fled to Priboj. Four days after the abduction, when Serbian police stopped Milan Lukić driving through Sjeverin, Lukić produced a forged ID and driver's licence, issued by the Višegrad police.

In the car the police found weapons and ammunition. Lukić and Dragicević were charged with illegal possession of weapons and forging personal documents. After a visit to the area by Radmilo Bogdanović, president of the Defense and Security Committee of the Yugoslav Parliament's Chamber of Citizens, an influential figure in Serbian police circles, Lukić and Dragicević were released from custody on grounds that lacked transparency. Milan Lukić was arrested by the Serbian police two more times, in 1993, on suspicion of having murdered a resident of Višegrad on the Serbian territory, and in 1994, when he was suspected of being the commander of the group that abducted several passengers from a train in Štrpci. Each time the investigation was stopped and Lukić was released.

== Prosecution ==
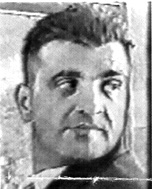
Milan Lukić

On 23 October 2002, after the fall of Milošević, the Office of the Public Prosecutor in Belgrade issued indictments against Milan Lukić, Dragutin Dragicević, Oliver Krsmanović, Djordje Sević and five other persons. Witness protection proved problematic in the trial.

On 29 September 2003 Dragutin Dragićević, Oliver Krsmanović and Milan Lukić were found guilty of the torture and murder of the abductees and sentenced to 20 years imprisonment (the latter two in absentia) while Đorđe Šević was sentenced to 15 years. These convictions were the first following the appointment of a special war crimes prosecutor by the Serbian parliament.

One explanation suggested for the abduction is that the abductees were kidnapped in order to be exchanged for 28 Serb soldiers and civilians that were captured days earlier by the Bosnian Army. After the exchange was refused, the abductees were murdered. Another is that the aim was to intimidate the Bosniaks in Sandžak as part of a plan to carry out ethnic cleansing of the frontier area bordering Bosnia and Herzegovina.

== Recent developments ==
On 22 October 2008, the 16th anniversary of the kidnappings and murders, Humanitarian Law Center (HLC) in Belgrade called on the Serbian government to investigate and identify the location where the remains of the 16 murder Bosniaks are hidden. HLC noted that "Serbia does not participate in marking the day the Bosniaks from Sjeverin were killed, nor is it ready to give the families of the victims financial compensation for their suffering".

On 2 April 2009 the First Municipal Court in Belgrade rejected a lawsuit filed by HLC against the Republic of Serbia on behalf of 25 family members of the victims seeking compensation. Even though the victims were citizens of Serbia, Serbian legislation on state reparations for family members of civilian victims of war denies their families any material support because the state does not consider the victims' family members to be victims of war (unlike other citizens of Serbia who lost close family members during the war).

On 20 July 2009 Milan Lukić was found guilty by the International Criminal Tribunal for the Former Yugoslavia (ICTY) of the commission of crimes against humanity and violations of war customs in the Višegrad municipality of Bosnia and Herzegovina, from May 1992 to October 1994. Lukić's crimes were described as among the most grave brought before the Tribunal and he is only the second individual sentenced by it to life imprisonment. The ICTY Trial Chamber observed that two of the crimes of which he was found guilty, the Pionirska street fire and the Bikavac fire, "exemplify the worst acts of inhumanity that a person may inflict upon others" and they "must rank high" in the "all too long, sad and wretched history of man's inhumanity to man".

It continues to be questioned whether Lukić's unit were acting as paramilitaries or were in fact part of the Republika Srpska Army's Višegrad Brigade. Oliver Krsmanović, one of Milan Lukić's accomplices found guilty by the Belgrade District Court livede as a fugitive from justice for years until his arrest was reported in May 2011. The bodies of the victims have yet to be found.

== Contemporary significance ==
The Sjeverin massacre remains a live issue in Serbia. The Serbian state's failure in the post-Milosevic era to resolve the human rights issues associated with the massacre is seen as emblematic of the problematic status of national minorities in Serbia.

In its report on the 2007 elections "Report on Status of National Minorities in Parliamentary Election Campaign 2007" Youth Initiative for Human Rights, an internationally respected human rights organisation, notes that the status of national minorities in Serbia has been determined "by the crimes and atmosphere of fear, which governed the country in the 1990s".

During the Milosevic era grave crimes were committed against minority communities not just in neighboring countries but also in Serbia itself. The most serious were committed in Sandžak, against members of the Bosniak minority, in Vojvodina, against the Croats, and in southern Serbia, against Albanians. During the 1990s the Serbian authorities and various armed groups killed, persecuted and tortured the Bosniaks from Sandžak and one of the consequences has been a drastic decrease of the number of Bosniaks in Sandžak.

The report identifies the Sjeverin massacre as one of the most serious of the crimes committed in Sandžak, referring to publications by the Humanitarian Law Center, the Sandžak Human Rights Committee and the Youth Initiative for Human Rights for further information.

It goes on to say that "Not a single mass crime committed in Serbia in the 1990s has been fully investigated, nor have the persons responsible for them been prosecuted and appropriately punished. Court proceedings have been completed in the case of Sjeverin, where four perpetrators have been pronounced guilty and given long prison sentences.

However, Serbia has done nothing to help the victims and their families, or to acknowledge the state responsibility for the actions of top state officials in the past. This is largely conducive to minorities' mistrust and lack of confidence in the Serbian state."

Later on in the report Goran Miletic of the Swedish Helsinki Committee for Human Rights identifies the second most important issue affecting minorities (after inadequate minority rights legislation) is "dealing with the past, or short – justice". He observes " Imagine that you belong to any of the national minorities in Serbia. Imagine yourself as Bosniak and remember only the weapon-search raids throughout Sanjak. Remember Sjeverin, remember everything that happened there. [...] These were serious violations of human rights. [...] The perpetrators have not been punished yet. Instead, they remain in police forces and still walk by the same people in Pazar, Tutin, Sjenica, and so on. I saw it myself."

== See also ==
- List of massacres in Bosnia and Herzegovina
- List of massacres of Bosniaks
- Bosnian genocide
