= Koritnik (Višegrad) =

- Village
- Location within Bosnia and Herzegovina
- Coordinates: 43°50′19″N 19°16′29″E
- Country: Bosnia and Herzegovina
- Entity: Republika Srpska
- Municipality: Višegrad
- Time zone: UTC+1 (CET)
  - Summer (DST): UTC+2 (CEST)

Koritnik (Serbian: Коритник) is a village in the municipality of Višegrad, Bosnia and Herzegovina.

In June 1992, 59 Bosniak women, children and elderly people, mainly from the village of Koritnik, were murdered in the Pionirska Street fire perpetrated by Bosnian Serb forces. The International Criminal Tribunal for the former Yugoslavia on 20 July 2009, sentenced Serb cousins Milan Lukić and Sredoje Lukić to life in prison and 30 years’ imprisonment respectively, for crimes that included the Pionirska Street fire and the murder of at least 60 Bosniak civilians in the Bikavac fire on 27 June 1992.
