= Momir Savić =

Momir Savić (born 21 January 1951, Drinsko, Višegrad) is a Bosnian Serb paramilitary commander convicted for war crimes committed during the ethnic cleansing of the Višegrad region of eastern Bosnia during the 1992-1995 Bosnian War.

== Crimes ==
Momir Savić was the close associate of Milan Lukić, notoriously responsible for the campaign of terror directed against Bosniak civilians in the strategically located town of Višegrad and the surrounding municipality in the spring and summer of 1992, as part of the ethnic cleansing of the Bosniak population from the Podrinja area of Eastern Bosnia.

Savić was charged by the War Crimes Chamber of the Court of Bosnia and Herzegovina with persecution of the Bosniak civilian population on political, national, ethnic and religious grounds between April and September 1992, as a member of a paramilitary unit at the time the Užice Corps of the former JNA commenced operations in the Višegrad region and later as commander of the 3rd Company of the Army of Republika Srpska's Višegrad Brigade. According to the indictment, he committed these crimes by commanding, committing and participating with other individuals in murder, forced deportation, imprisonment, torture and rape. He was accused of not preventing or punishing the actions of those under his command.

The specific crimes of which he was accused included the interrogation and beating of 4 Bosniak civilians and the plundering and burning down of the houses of 2 Bosniak civilians, as member of a group of several Serb soldiers, in the village of Meremišlje on 29 April. On 23 May, in the settlement of Drinsko, he and a group of other Serb soldiers took 10 Bosniak civilians from their houses, interrogated and brutalised them and then took them to Kik hill, in Pušni Do forest and shot them. On 25 May, when one of a group of captured Bosniak civilians being beaten up by Savić and a group of other Serb soldiers tried to run away, Savić shot and killed him. Individually, between 7 June and late September 1992, on numerous occasions he went fully armed to the house of a Bosniak woman where he raped her, threatening her not to tell anyone.

Savić was also accused by Bakira Hasečić of the rape and war crime victims' organisation Association of Women Victims of War (Udruzenje Žene-Žrtve Rata) of being responsible for the disappearance of a boy named Himzo (Hamed) Oprasic from a column of 800 civilians expelled from the village of Okrugla and of committing and supervising "horrendous and heinous" crimes in the Rudo area. Women Victims of War worked determinedly for a number of years to ensure that Savić was brought to justice.

Savić was also identified by survivors as one of the armed escort who took part in the execution of at least 50 Bosniak civilian prisoners at the Paklenik ravine on 15 June 1992.

== Trial ==
Savić was charged with crimes against humanity under Article 172(1)(h) (persecution) of the Criminal Code of BiH (CC BiH) involving the following: a) Depriving another person of his life (murder), d) Deportation or forcible transfer of population, e) Imprisonment or other severe deprivation of physical liberty in violation of fundamental rules of international law, f) Torture, g) Coercing another by force or by threat of immediate attack upon his life or limb, or the life or limb of a person close to him, to sexual intercourse or an equivalent sexual act (rape), i) Enforced disappearance of persons, k) Other inhumane acts of a similar character intentionally causing great suffering, or serious injury to body or to physical or mental health. all in conjunction with Article 180(1)(2) (individual and command criminal responsibility) of the CC BiH.

He pleaded not guilty. The trial commenced on 12 August 2008 and on 2 July 2009 the Bosnian War Crimes Court pronounced the first instance verdict, finding Savić guilty of crimes against humanity, and sentenced him to 18 years of imprisonment.

== Abscondment ==
The session of the Appellate panel of the Section I for War Crimes of the Court was held on 19 February 2010. In June 2010, when confirmation of Savić's conviction was announced, he failed to respond to the bail conditions set at the time of his release from jail in late 2008 during the appeal. He has not been seen since. Judge Saban Maksumić, presiding judge of the Bosnian War Crimes Court, was severely criticised for allowing Savić to remain at liberty pending sentencing.̪
