= Risto Perišić =

Bosnian politician

Risto Perisić is a senior member of the "Crisis Staff Committee" responsible for the civilian administration of the municipality of Višegrad in eastern Bosnia and Herzegovina and commander of police at the time of the outbreak of the Bosnian War (1992–95), at the time when the Višegrad massacres took place and Višegrad was purged of its entire Bosniak population in a campaign of terror conducted by Milan Lukić and his White Eagles gang. Perisić as commander of police for the municipality of Višegrad took no action to check Lukić and members of the local police took part directly in numerous acts of violence against the civilian population.
