= Savović =

Savović (Serbian: Савовић) is a Serbian surname. It may refer to:

- Boban Savović (born 1979), basketball player
- Boris Savović (born 1987), basketball player
- Branimir Savović, politician
- Milenko Savović (born 1960), basketball player
- Predrag Savović (born 1976), basketball player
