= Vojno camp =

Concentration camp in Bosnia and Herzegovina

- Detention camp
- Location within Bosnia and Herzegovina
- Coordinates: 43°24′26″N 17°52′05″E
- Location: Vojno, near Mostar, Bosnia and Herzegovina
- Operated by: Croatian Defence Council (HVO)
- Operational: July 1993 to April 1994
- Inmates: Bosniaks

Vojno camp was a detention camp set up by the Croatian Defence Council (HVO) from June 1993 to March 1994, to detain tens of thousands of Bosniaks in the Mostar municipality. Bosniaks in the camp were subject to killings, mistreatment, rapes, detention and murders.

== The camp ==
Conditions at Vojno Camp were harsh and unhealthy, with overcrowding, insufficient food and water, poor ventilation, insufficient bedding and inadequate sanitation facilities.

The HVO physically and mentally abused Bosniak men detained at the Vojno Camp on a daily basis. Herceg-Bosna/HVO forces killed at least thirteen Bosniak men while they were detained at Vojno Camp and injured many others. The HVO forces routinely beat Bosniak men with fists, feet, rubber batons and various wooden objects. Bosniak men were subjected to electrical shocks, often forced to beat each other and otherwise abused and humiliated. Bosniak detainees were forced to witness the summary execution of other detainees. Detainees were often subjected to particularly severe mistreatment in retaliation for ABiH military successes.

Bosniak men detained at Vojno Camp, together with Bosniak men detained at the Heliodrom (who were often sent to Vojno Camp on a seven-day rotation) were used in forced labour in the Vojno area. The forced labour included building military fortifications, digging trenches, carrying ammunition to HVO soldiers, and retrieving killed and injured HVO soldiers, often along the confrontation line and in the midst of combat conditions. Bosniak men engaged in such labour were regularly exposed to mortar, sniper and other small arms fire, and at least thirty-nine Bosniak men were killed or wounded.

The HVO detained approximately fifty civilian Bosniak women and girls (together with their small children) at Vojno Camp, from approximately June to December 1993. The Bosniak women and others were held without any genuine or bona fide effort by the HVO to determine their status or distinguish military detainees from civilians. Neither did the HVO provide for the civilians’ release or transfer to a safe location.

HVO soldiers repeatedly raped and sexually assaulted approximately fifty civilian Bosniak women and girls detained at Vojno Camp. Such episodes of sexual assault were often preceded or accompanied by beatings or threats that non-compliance would result in the woman's child (or children) being killed.

Bosniak children detained at the Vojno Camp were regularly exposed to cruel treatment, hunger and separation from their mothers, resulting in physical suffering and trauma to these, some of the younger victims of the Herceg-Bosna/HVO persecution and cleansing.

== Recent developments ==
Marko Radić, Dragan Šunjić, Damir Brekalo and Mirko Vračević were found guilty of having participated, as members of the Croatian Defence Council in the killings, mistreatment, rapes, detention and murders of the detained Bosniaks. The Bosnian State Court sentenced Marko Radić to 25 years in prison, Dragan Šunjić to 21 years, Damir Brekalo to 20 and Mirko Vračević to 14. Their sentences were reduced in a second-instance verdict to 21, 16, 20 and 12 years respectively.

The highest-ranking surviving leaders Jadranko Prlić, Bruno Stojić, Slobodan Praljak, Milivoj Petković, Valentin Corić, Berislav Pušić were charged with crimes against humanity, grave breaches of the Geneva Conventions and violations of the laws of war.

== See also ==
- Dretelj camp
- Gabela camp
- Heliodrom camp
- Keraterm camp
- Manjača camp
- Musala camp
- Omarska camp
- Trnopolje camp
- Uzamnica camp
- Vilina Vlas
