= Bakira Hasečić =

Bosnian human rights activist

Bakira Hasečić is a Bosnian human rights activist who advocates for the rights of women who were raped during the Bosnian War.

== Early life ==
Hasečić was born to a Bosniak family in Višegrad, a town in Bosnia and Herzegovina close to the border with Serbia. After the onset of the Bosnian War, artillery bombardment of the town led to it falling under the control of the Yugoslav People's Army; after they officially withdrew in May 1992, local Serb leaders established the Serbian Municipality of Višegrad and commenced an ethnic cleansing programme perpetrated by Bosnian Serb soldiers from the Army of Republika Srpska in addition to the White Eagles, a paramilitary group led by Milan Lukić. A detention camp was established at Vilina Vlas, which was found in a 1994 United Nations Commission of Enquiry report to be a location of mass rape. During this period, Hasečić was raped multiple times. Her sister died in Vilina Vlas; of an estimated 200 women imprisoned there, it is alleged fewer than 10 survived internment. In total, 17 members of Hasečić's family were killed.

== Human rights activism ==
Locally, Hasečić serves as the president of the Association of Women Victims of War (Bosnian: Udruženje žene-žrtve rata), based in Sarajevo. The organisation campaigns for the rights of female victims of crime during the Bosnian War, including securing financial and psychological aid, and gathering evidence and information about war criminals in hiding in the Republika Srpska with a view to securing their criminal prosecution. Hasečić's work has led to some success; during the trial of Željko Lelek for crimes against humanity committed at Višegrad, Lelek blamed Hasečić for his detention, with judge Paul Melchior Brilman concluding that Lelek’s allegations imply that “Hasečić is a very important person” in his prosecution and asked the accused and his defence attorney when they intended to invite her to testify. The attorney said: “We do not intend to invite her as she already testified as a prosecution witness.” Lelek was subsequently found guilty of rape and other crimes. The Association of Women Victims of War have played a role in 29 war criminals being charged at the International Criminal Tribunal for the Former Yugoslavia (ICTY) and over 70 at Bosnian courts.

Internationally, Hasečić has worked with international organisations including Amnesty International and Human Rights Watch to seek justice for female victims of the Bosnian War, and has also testified on multiple occasions at the ICTY. Hasečić's most prominent campaigning has included calling for rape charges to be added to the indictment against Milan and Sredoje Lukić at the ICTY; at the time, chief prosecutor Carla del Ponte asserted that they lacked the evidence to include those charges due to no witnesses coming forward prior to the indictment's filing, something Hasečić denied. The UN's completion strategy for the Tribunal ruled out prosecutors bringing additional charges or amending existing ones unless a case transferred to another court. Del Ponte suggested the case to transfer to the War Crimes Chamber in Sarajevo and for Hasečić and Women Victims of War to work with state prosecutors there to amend the indictments against the Lukić cousins. Ultimately, the Lukić case was heard at the ICTY in 2008; a late motion from the prosecution to add rape and sexual slavery in Višegrad to the indictment was rejected due to it being felt it prejudiced the right of the accused to have enough time to mount a reasonable defence. Both men were ultimately found guilty of war crimes.

Hasečić previously advocated for the return of Muslims to Višegrad, but in 2005 stated she had resigned herself to the fact that "the return has failed, because war criminals continue to live freely there. Almost no [Muslims] returned to the town".

== Media and recognition ==
Hasečić and her work has featured in documentary programmes produced by the BBC and Al Jazeera.

In 2018, Hasečić received an honorary degree from Glasgow Caledonian University in recognition of her work as a human rights advocate for victims of sexual violence.

== See also ==
- Milan Lukić
- Vilina Vlas
