= Zagré =

Zagré is a Burkinabe surname. Notable people with the surname include:

- Abdel Zagré (born 2004), Burkinabe footballer
- Anne Zagré (born 1990), Belgian hurdler
- Arthur Zagré (born 2001), Burkinabe footballer
- Ben Aziz Zagré (1998–2026), Burkinabe footballer
- Calixte Zagré (died 2011), Burkinabe football manager

== See also ==
- Ismaël Zagrè (born 1992), Burkinabé footballer
- Žagre, a village in Bosnia and Herzegovina
