= Vilina Vlas =

Former concentration camp in Bosnia and Herzegovina

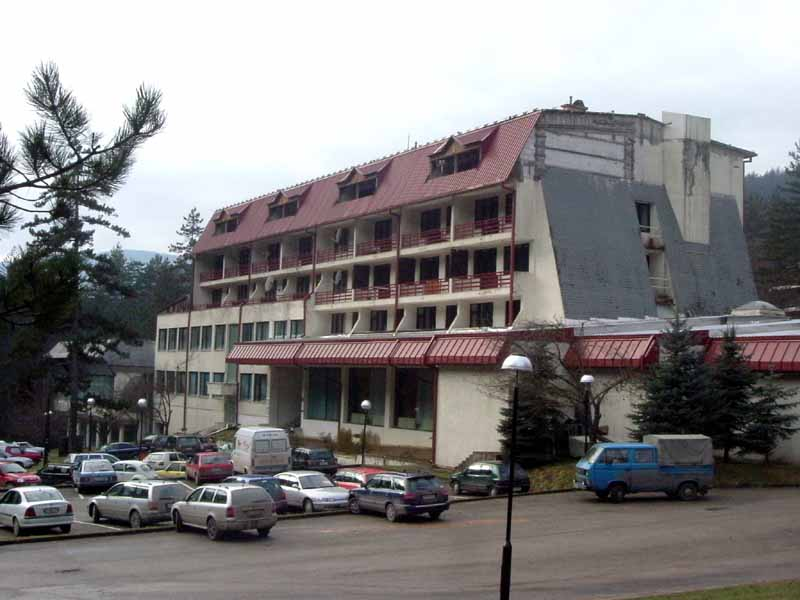
- Interactive map of the Vilina Vlas area

General information
- Status: Open
- Location: Višegrad
- Coordinates: 43.820800°N 19.310100°E
- Construction started: 1979
- Completed: 1982
- Opened: 1982

Vilina Vlas is a former concentration camp and hotel in Višegrad where UN experts have spoken of systematic detention and rape of the area's Bosniak and non-Serb girls and women during the Bosnian War. The spa is named after the plant of the same name that grows on and near the spa.

== History ==
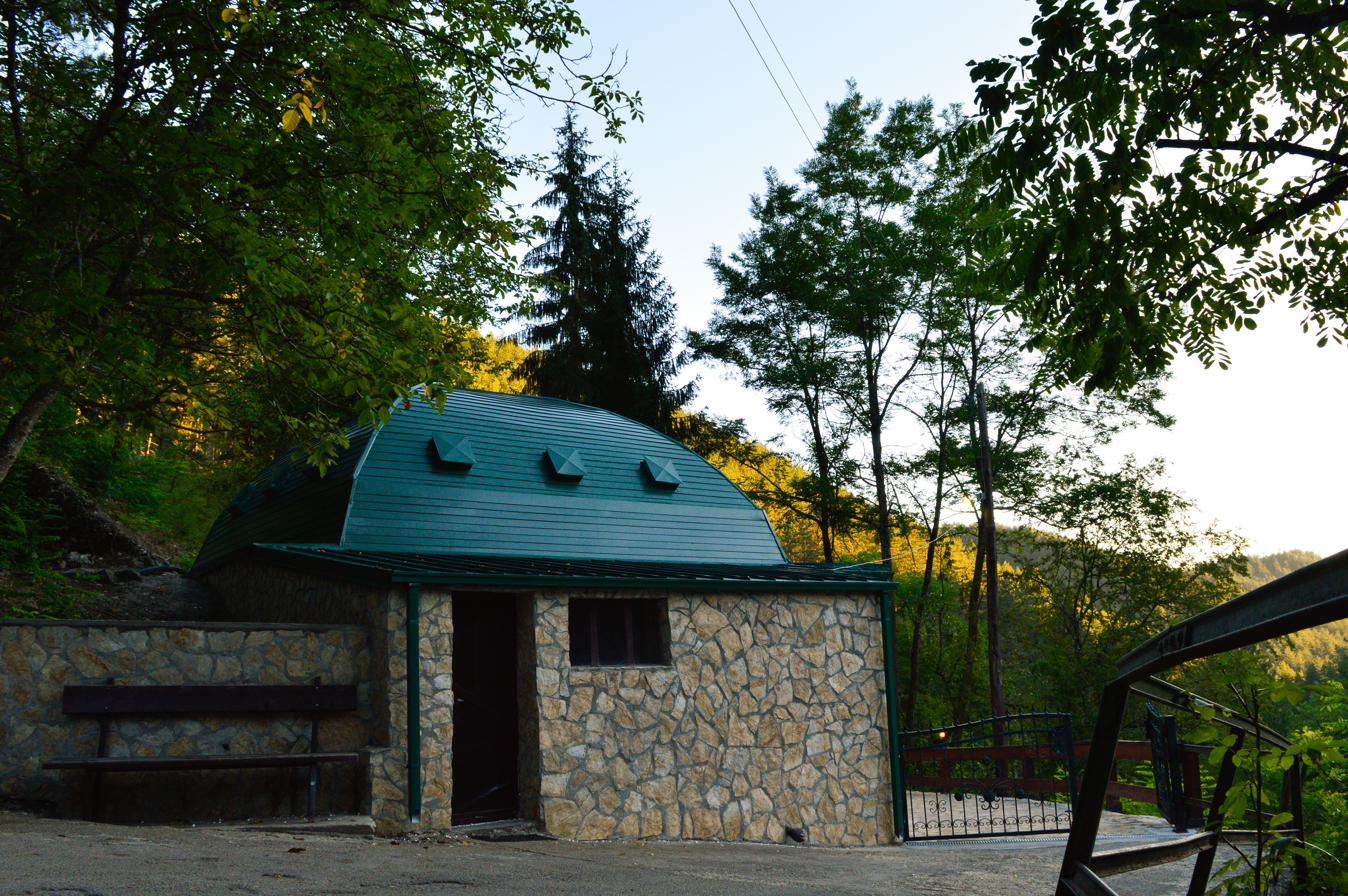
"Turkish bath", exterior

The hot spring and spa of the Vilina Vlas site were known of before the construction of Višegrad's bridge, but were rediscovered when work began on the bridge. The hot spring was first noticed by Ottoman workers extracting stone for the construction of the bridge. In 1575, Sokollu Mehmed Pasha ordered the construction of two Turkish baths, "Kadino Kupatilo" and "Mehmed-Pasha's Kupatilo," causing the bridge's workers to inadvertedly become its first regular visitors and the first "tourists" to use the healing properties of the hot spring. (Note: Though referred to as hamams or Turkish baths, all available images show only two mineral water springs, without any hot rooms (typically found in a hamam) which may originally have been included.)

To this day, "Mehmed-Pasha's Bath" remains intact in largely the same condition as its construction. After World War 2, the weapon factory in Višegrad, "Vistad," built a recreation center for its workers. In 1979, the construction of a then-modern hotel named "Villa Vlas" began, and was completed in 1982. The hotel is still operating today. It is located five kilometers from Višegrad, surrounded by coniferous forests, and has 70 rooms, including single and double rooms and apartments, totaling 160 beds. The hotel offers two restaurants with 370 seats, an open and closed hall with around one hundred seats for seminars, meeting rooms, an aperitif bar, a shop, and a hair salon. Luxuriously equipped bungalows behind the hotel are also available for accommodation.

== The camp ==
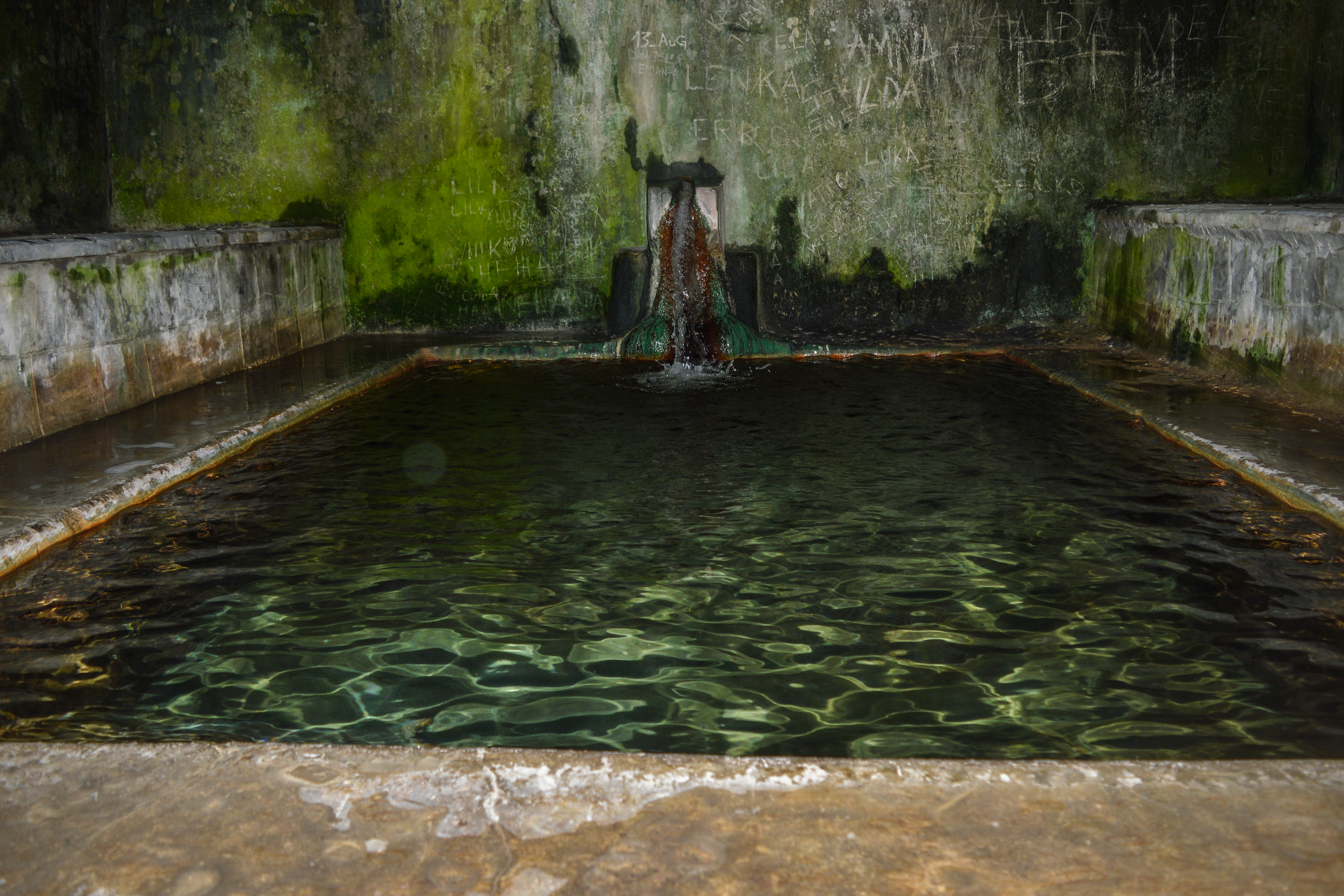
Turkish bath, interior

In 1992 the concentration camp at the Vilina Vlas hotel was one of the Višegrad area's main detention facilities. It was established by the Uzice Corps at the end of April 1992 and played a significant role in the ethnic cleansing of the area's non-Serb population. The hotel served as a camp "brothel". Bosniak women and girls, including many not yet 14 years old, were brought to the camp by police officers and members of the paramilitary groups the White Eagles and Arkan's and Vojislav Šešelj's men.

Milan Lukić, leader of a local group of paramilitaries referred to variously as the White Eagles, the Avengers or the Wolves, established his headquarters at the Vilina Vlas Hotel, one of various locations where local Bosniaks were detained. The group, with ties to the local police and Serb military units, played a prominent role in the ethnic cleansing of Višegrad, committing numerous crimes including murder, rape, torture, beatings, looting and destruction of property.

Many rapes in the Višegrad area were perpetrated in systematic fashion. Reports to the United Nations Commission of Experts to the Security Council (the Bassiouni Commission) state that victims were rounded up and transported to places like Vilina Vlas and the Hotel Višegrad for the purpose of being detained and raped.

One report to the Bassiouni Commission estimated that 200 women, primarily Bosniak, were detained at Vilina Vlas and sexually assaulted. The hotel was known as a place where only young, beautiful women were detained and in testimony given to the Bassiouni Commission it is claimed that women brought to this camp had been chosen to bear "Chetnik" children and were "selected" carefully. It was claimed that younger girls were taken to the hotel while older women were taken to other locations, such as occupied or abandoned houses, and raped. The number and consistency of the reports were considered to provide reasonable confirmation that a large number of rapes did in fact occur at the hotel.

The prisoners were raped repeatedly and beaten with batons. Most of the women prisoners were either killed or took their own lives, while others were exiled or became insane. Only a handful of the women prisoners survived – fewer than ten according to the Association of Women Victims of War, an organisation which works with women survivors and campaigns for the prosecution of the perpetrators. The bodies of the victims have not been found and are alleged to have been buried in concealed locations and then reburied.

During the Sjeverin massacre, 16 Bosniaks were abducted by Milan Lukić while travelling on a bus from Serbia to Bosnia and were taken to Vilina Vlas, where they were tortured and murdered.

The camp was eventually closed once its existence became known outside Bosnia and the surviving detainees removed to an unknown fate.

Following media reports that Montenegrin pensioners were going to the Vilina Vlas Hotel and Spa in Višegrad for rehabilitation, UDIK and the Center for Civic Education (CCE) from Podgorica launched an initiative on 13 March 2026 with the Pension Fund of Montenegro (PIO) to terminate the contract with the Vilina Vlas. On 20 March 2026, the Montenegrin Ministry of Social Protection, Family Care and Demography announced that on 16 March 2026, the fund unilaterally terminated the cooperation agreement with the Vilina Vlas rehabilitation center in Višegrad. UDIK and CCE welcomed the ministry's decision on 23 March 2026.

== Trials ==
Milan Lukić was found guilty of having executed detainees kept at the camp. He was not charged with rape despite them being well documented. The President of the Association of Women Victims of War, Bakira Hasečić, has severely criticised the International Criminal Tribunal for the former Yugoslavia at The Hague for failing to include rape among the charges against Milan Lukić when he was brought to trial. One woman survivor reported Lukić raping her several times while she was a prisoner at the hotel.

Oliver Krsmanović was charged with the rape and grave sexual abuse of female Bosniak detainees at Vilina Vlas as well as for the massacre of 70 Bosniaks in the village of Bikavac.

Risto Perišić, Chief of Police and Crisis Staff member, is alleged to have aided in the torture, rape, and execution of detainees at Vilina Vlas. Duško Andrić, the director of Vilina Vlas, was reported as having been one of the perpetrators of rape at the hotel. Duško Andrić is a pensioner still living in Višegrad. He has never been charged with any offenses.

== Art and culture ==
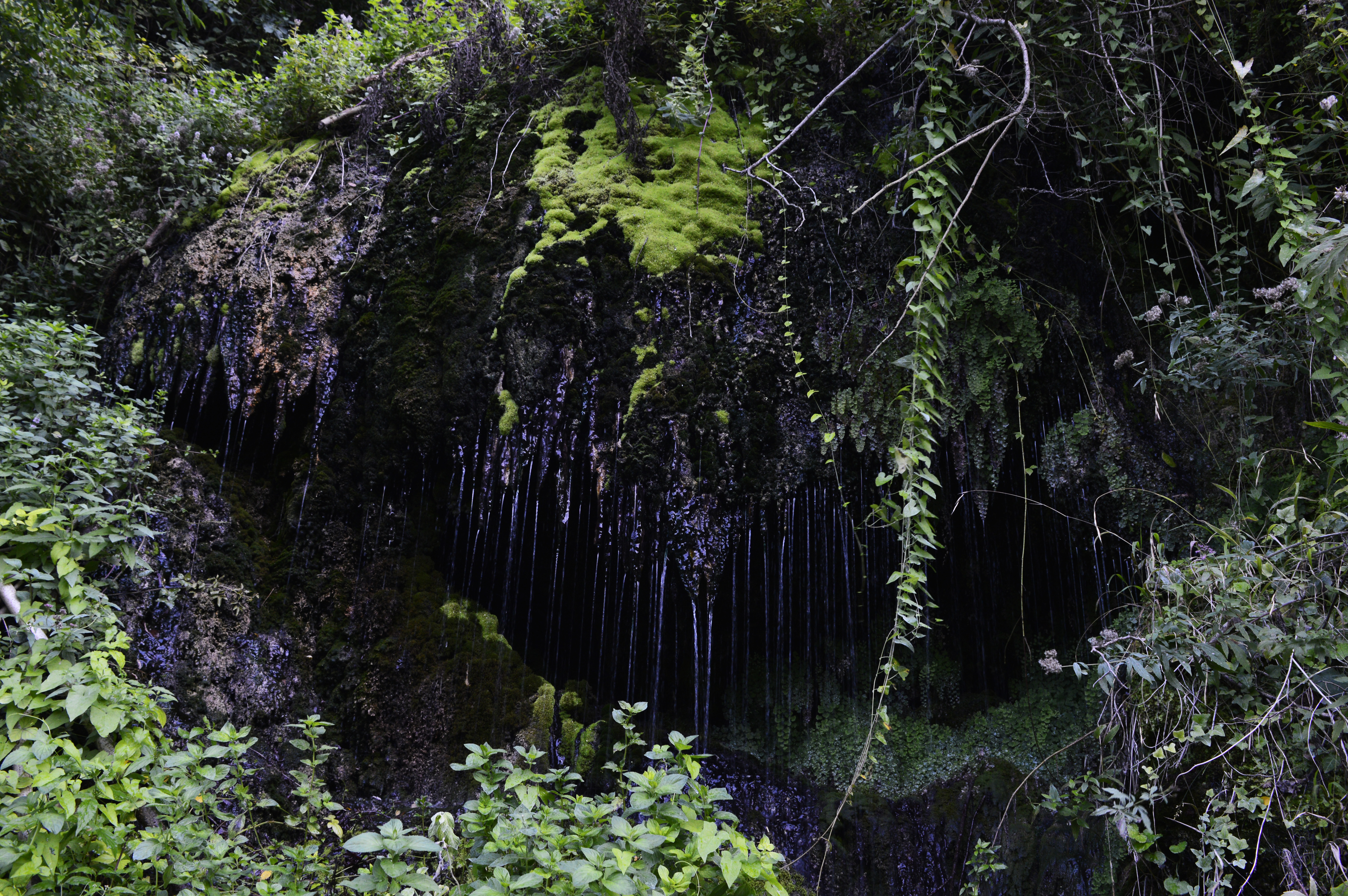
The resort's namesake plant growing near the site

A stay at Vilina Vlas during a visit to Višegrad inspired the Australian performance artist Kym Vercoe's work "seven kilometres north-east: A performance about geography, tourism and atrocity". In 2013 a film by Jasmila Žbanić and Kym Vercoe For Those Who Can Tell No Tales was released.

== See also ==
- Bosnian Genocide
- Dretelj camp
- Gabela camp
- Heliodrom camp
- Keraterm camp
- Manjača camp
- Omarska camp
- Trnopolje camp
- Uzamnica camp
- Vojno camp
