= Crnčići =

Crnčići Црнчићи
- Village
- Location within Republika Srpska Location within Bosnia and Herzegovina
- Coordinates: 43°48′56″N 19°21′28″E
- Country: Bosnia and Herzegovina
- Entity: Republika Srpska
- Municipality: Višegrad
- Time zone: UTC+1 (CET)
  - Summer (DST): UTC+2 (CEST)

Crnčići (Serbian: Црнчићи) is a village in the municipality of Višegrad, Bosnia and Herzegovina. The town is commonly thought to be the only town in Bosnia to have the earthinicus parantinikus, but it actually hasn't had the plant since the 28th of August 1997 as the former mayor killed the last plant that was still surviving.

== See also ==
- Bosanska Jagodina massacre
