= Željko Lelek =

Bosnian Serb war criminal (born 1962)

Željko Lelek (born 9 February 1962, Goražde, Bosnia and Herzegovina), a convicted Bosnian Serb war criminal who was the first individual indicted for the mass rape crimes that were a feature of the expulsion of the Bosniak (Bosnian Muslim) population of the town of Višegrad, as part of the strategic campaign of ethnic cleansing carried out in the Drina Valley in the early days of the Bosnian War.

== Biography ==
Lelek took part in the widespread and systematic attacks on Bosniak civilians that were carried out in Višegrad between April and June 1992 by Bosnian Serb forces assisted by paramilitary groups from neighbouring Serbia. Some 4000 Muslims from Višegrad were disappeared. Lelek, a policeman, was a member of the group led by the war criminals Milan Lukić and Mitar Vasiljević, both found guilty by the International Criminal Tribunal for the former Yugoslavia (ICTY) at The Hague of some of the most horrific crimes committed during the Bosnian War.

Lelek was found guilty of taking part in persecution of the Bosniak (Bosnian Muslim) population, grave freedom deprivations, grave sexual assaults and forcible transfer of the population, in a campaign during which Bosnian Muslim men were abducted from their homes and places of work, detained and killed while women were taken to a camp where they were tortured and raped.

In April 1992 Lelek and Lukić repeatedly raped a Muslim woman in the Vilina Vlas hotel, on the outskirts of Visegrad. In June 1992, Lelek forced a Muslim woman detained at Vilina Vlas to "provide him with sexual services". In May and June 1992 Lelek and other Bosnian Serb soldiers and policemen abducted Muslim men from their homes near Višegrad and imprisoned them. They robbed and demolished the men's homes. In the course of one robbery and abduction Lelek forced a Muslim woman and her 80-year-old bed-ridden mother-in-law to take off their clothes to prove they had no money with them. Azra Osmanagić, a prosecution witness, one of a group of Višegrad women forcibly transferred to Bosnian government-held territory and whose husband was abducted and killed, observed that Lelek "was raised with us, went to school with us, lived by us and did such terrible things".

Osmanagić and others were angered by the Court's verdict after the Trial Panel dismissed the charges against Lelek of the two decapitations and three killings in May 1992 and also the charge of killing the two women and baby at Mehmed Paša Sokolović Bridge and the Appeal Panel confirmed Lelek's acquittal. The Appeal Panel found that an amended indictment that left out the relevant criminal acts referred to in the previous indictment signified that the Prosecution had dropped these charges and that this had been explicitly and verbally confirmed before the court.

On 23 May 2008, Lelek was found guilty and sentenced to 13 years in prison. On 12 January 2009, the Appellate Panel modified the First-instance Verdict and found Lelek guilty of crimes against humanity and sentenced him to 16 years of imprisonment.
