= Vojno =

- Village
- Location within Bosnia and Herzegovina
- Coordinates: 43°24′30.85″N 17°52′7.84″E
- Country: Bosnia and Herzegovina
- Entity: Federation of Bosnia and Herzegovina
- Canton: Herzegovina-Neretva
- Municipality: City of Mostar

Area
  - Total: 2.18 sq mi (5.64 km^{2})

Population (2013)
  - Total: 508
  - Density: 233/sq mi (90.1/km^{2})
- Time zone: UTC+1 (CET)
  - Summer (DST): UTC+2 (CEST)
- Postal code: 88000 (Same as Mostar)
- Area code: (+387) 36 345

Vojno is a village in the City of Mostar, Bosnia and Herzegovina.

== Demographics ==
According to the 2013 census, its population was 508.

Ethnicity in 2013
Ethnicity	Number	Percentage
Croats	474	93.3%
Serbs	21	4.1%
Bosniaks	8	1.6%
other/undeclared	5	1.0%
Total	508	100%

== See also ==
- Vojno camp
