= Branimir Savović =

Branimir Savović (born 10 June 1953) is the former president of the Serbian Democratic Party (SDS) for the municipality of Višegrad in eastern Bosnia and Herzegovina at the time of the outbreak of the Bosnian War 1992-1995. He was appointed to the Presidency of the Municipality by the Bosnian Serb authorities and became President of the "Crisis Staff Committee" established to assume responsibility for the civilian administration of the town. It was during his presidency of the Crisis Staff that the Višegrad massacres took place and the campaign of terror conducted by Milan Lukić and his White Eagles gang proceeded unchecked until Višegrad was purged of its entire Bosniak population. Višegrad has been described as second only to Srebrenica as a byword for ethnic cleansing and for humanity at its cruellest.

After the end of the war when Višegrad was allocated to the Republika Srpska entity under the Dayton Agreement of 1995, Savović remained president of the Višegrad branch of the SDS and became mayor of the town.

== Association with the 1992 Bosnian Serb Secession ==
Evidence given by one of the protected witnesses testifying at the trial of Slobodan Milosevic by the International Criminal Tribunal for the former Yugoslavia (ICTY) at The Hague pointed to Branimir Savović's participation in the concertation of arrangements for the Bosnian Serb seizure of the town of Višegrad. Višegrad, whose population according to the 1991 population survey was 62% Bosnian Muslim, was strategically located at a historic crossing point of the River Drina on the main road from Belgrade and Užice in Serbia to the Bosnian capital Sarajevo. For much of its length the River Drina formed the border between Bosnia and Serbia. The "Six Strategic Objectives of the Serbian People in Bosnia" drawn up by the Bosnian Serb Presidency and adopted by the breakaway Serb National Assembly on 12 May 1992, envisaged the integration of the Drina Valley with Serbia and necessitated a change in the area's ethnic composition.

The witness, under the pseudonym B-1505, told how forces of the Yugoslav National Army (JNA) Užice Corps arrived in Višegrad in April 1992, under the command of Colonel Dragoljub Ojdanić, one of Milosevic's top commanders, and on 13 April 1992 took control of the town before helping to prepare the expulsion of its Muslim population.

The witness met Colonel Ojdanić twice. The first time the witness overheard five JNA officers at army headquarters planning the ethnic cleansing of the town's Muslim population; he asked Ojdanić to protect a very large group of refugees whom the JNA then proceeded to concentrate in an area of the town, under threat of being killed by units like Milan Lukić's marauding White Eagles if they ventured outside that area.

The second time, as B-1505 was waiting to see Col. Ojdanić at the Višegrad Hotel, he saw the Bosnian Serb Vice-President Biljana Plavšić arrive with Branimir Savović (wearing a military camouflage uniform) for talks with the JNA officers.

== The Campaign of Violence against the Bosniaks of Višegrad ==
On 19 May 1992 the Užice Corps officially withdrew from Višegrad, handing over control of the town to the Serbian Municipality of Višegrad, under the presidency of Branimir Savović. The numerous acts of violence perpetrated against the Muslim civilian population in Višegrad by the Serb police, members of paramilitary groups and local Serbs increased with the departure of the Užice Corps. These acts of violence included unlawful arrests and beatings, abductions, rapes, theft and destruction of property, and arbitrary killings. The Drina River was used to dump many of the bodies. Looting and destruction of non-Serb homes and property was widespread and the town's two mosques were destroyed.

The town's pre-war population of 21,000 included 13,000-14,000 Muslims. By 1993 there were none left.

Atrocities perpetrated throughout the town and the surrounding area, including massacres such as the described by the President of the ICTY as horrific events ranking high "in the all too long, sad and wretched history of man’s inhumanity to man", without any sign that the civilian authorities made any sustained attempt to limit or condemn the violent lawlessness of groups such as Milan Lukic's. The ICTY Trial Chamber in the Lukić case found that Milan Lukić was an opportunist who took advantage of an environment in which he could commit crimes against Muslims with impunity.

== Milan Lukić's allegations ==
In 2005 the Banja Luka daily newspaper Nezavisne Novine announced that it had received a letter from Milan Lukić, then still at large, in which he claimed that his brother had been killed by people who had committed crimes in Višegrad and were now "bosses" of Višegrad and Foča, Branimir Savović, Risto Perisić and Radomir Njegus. Lukić claimed that "all Muslims in Višegrad and Foča were killed on their orders". He had been working in the police at the beginning of the war under the command of Risto Perisić while Perisić’s chief was Branimir Savović. He also alleged that Savović and Perisić had become rich selling information about mass graves of Muslims to foreigners which they knew about only because they were responsible for burying the victims in the mass graves during the war.

== A continuing culture of silence in Višegrad ==
A culture of silence imposed by a network of former and current figures from the government, police and organised crime known as the "Preventiva" supposedly protects individuals responsible for crimes committed in Višegrad during Branimir Savović's presidency of the Crisis Staff Committee and impedes the search for the remains of the victims still missing from that period. Witnesses have been intimidated and even murdered, as in the case of the former police inspector Milan Josipović, shot and killed when he was said to be prepared to give evidence at a trial of high-level officials. Investigators recovering bodies revealed by the draining of Lake Perućac in 2010 continued to encounter a lack of local cooperation.
