= Bikavac fire =

1992 arson in Bosnia and Herzegovina

Coordinates: 43°46′47″N 19°17′36″E

The Bikavac fire refers to the arson perpetrated in Bikavac, near Višegrad, eastern Bosnia, on 27 June 1992 in which at least 60 Bosniak civilians, mostly women and children, were burned alive after the Serb forces forced them into a house which was then set on fire.

== Trial ==
On 20 July 2009 Milan and Sredoje Lukić were sentenced to life in prison and 30 years imprisonment respectively, for crimes that included the Bikavac fire and the murder of 59 Bosniak civilians in the Pionirska Street fire on 14 June 1992, which occurred after the civilians were locked into one room of a house that was then set on fire.

It was found that on 27 June 1992, during the ethnic cleansing of the Drina Valley by the Bosnian Serbs, forces under the command of Milan Lukić forced approximately 70 Bosniak civilians into one room of in a house in the settlement of Bikavac, near Višegrad. After the captives were robbed, the house was set on fire and the occupants were left to burn alive. The International Criminal Tribunal for the former Yugoslavia Trial Chamber found that at least 60 Bosniak civilians were killed in the fire.

According to the testimony of Zehra Turjačanin, there were many children in the house, the youngest less than one year old. Most of the victims were young women with children, along with some elderly men and women. The Serb soldiers broke the windows, threw hand grenades into the house and fired shots at the people inside, then set the house on fire. Turjačanin and one of her sisters managed to get to the door, but a heavy iron garage door had been placed against it from the outside. She managed to squeeze through a small gap in the door; her sister remained inside. Outside Serb soldiers were lying on the grass, drinking.

When Judge Patrick Robinson, presiding, summed up the International Criminal Tribunal for the former Yugoslavia's findings following the trial of Milan Lukić and his cousin Sredoje Lukić, he observed that:

In the all too long, sad and wretched history of man’s inhumanity to man, the Pionirska street and Bikavac fires must rank high. At the close of the twentieth century, a century marked by war and bloodshed on a colossal scale, these horrific events stand out for the viciousness of the incendiary attack, for the obvious premeditation and calculation that defined it, for the sheer callousness and brutality of herding, trapping and locking the victims in the two houses, thereby rendering them helpless in the ensuing inferno, and for the degree of pain and suffering inflicted on the victims as they were burnt alive.

== See also ==
- Višegrad massacres
- Pionirska Street fire
