= Pionirska Street fire =

1992 Bosnian arson fire

Coordinates: 43°47′10″N 19°17′57″E

The Pionirska Street fire was an arson fire perpetrated by Bosnian Serb forces in Višegrad, eastern Bosnia, on 14 June 1992 in which 59 Bosniak women, children and elderly people were murdered by being locked into one room of a house, which was then set on fire.

== Trial ==
On 20 July 2009, Milan Lukić and Sredoje Lukić were sentenced to life in prison and 30 years’ imprisonment respectively, for crimes that included the Pionirska Street fire and the murder of at least 60 Bosniak civilians in the Bikavac fire on 27 June 1992, when the civilians were forced into a house, all exits were blocked and several explosive devices and petrol were thrown in, setting the house on fire.

It was found that on 14 June 1992, during the ethnic cleansing of the Drina Valley by the Bosnian Serbs, 70 Bosniak women, children and elderly men, most of them from the village of Koritnik, were confined in a house in Pionirska Street, Višegrad by cousins Milan and Sredoje Lukić. They were locked into one room of the house, which was then set on fire. Milan Lukić was found to have thrown an explosive device into the room, setting the house ablaze. 59 of the occupants died. Lukić shot at people trying to escape from the burning house. All the survivors that were still alive testified at the trial.

When Judge Patrick Robinson, presiding, summed up the International Criminal Tribunal for the former Yugoslavia's findings following the trial of Milan and Sredoje Lukić, he observed:

In the all too long, sad and wretched history of man’s inhumanity to man, the Pionirska street and Bikavac fires must rank high. At the close of the twentieth century, a century marked by war and bloodshed on a colossal scale, these horrific events stand out for the viciousness of the incendiary attack, for the obvious premeditation and calculation that defined it, for the sheer callousness and brutality of herding, trapping and locking the victims in the two houses, thereby rendering them helpless in the ensuing inferno, and for the degree of pain and suffering inflicted on the victims as they were burnt alive.

Alleged participant, Radomir Šušnjar, was arrested in France on 4 April 2014. He was extradited to Bosnia in June 2018 to face charges relating to the fire. On 30 October 2019 he was sentenced to 20 years for war crimes for his involvement in the arson and killing of the Bosniaks.

== See also ==
- Višegrad massacres
- Bikavac fire
- List of massacres of Bosniaks
- Bosnian genocide
