= Association of Women Victims of War =

Nnon-governmental organisation based in Bosnia and Herzegovina

Association of Women Victims of War (Bosnian: Udruženje Žena Žrtva Rata) is a non-governmental organisation based in Sarajevo, Bosnia and Herzegovina, that campaigns for the rights of women victims of rape and similar crimes during the 1992–1995 Bosnian War.

The association gathers evidence and information about war criminals and rapists hiding in the Republika Srpska entity of Bosnia with a view to securing their prosecution. It has provided key testimony in rape and sexual abuse trials linked to the conflict and has helped obtain justice and financial and psychological assistance for many of its thousand-plus members.

The organisation's founder and president Bakira Hasečić is a Bosniak woman from Višegrad, in the Drina valley of eastern Bosnia and Herzegovina. She was herself a victim of the notorious war criminal Milan Lukić during the rape campaign that was a significant component of the ethnic cleansing of Višegrad in 1992. Under Bakira Hasečić's leadership the association has become one of the most prominent human rights advocacy organisations in Bosnia, working with international human rights organisations such as Amnesty International and Human Rights Watch. The association has been prominent in campaigning for national and international courts to prosecute the crime of rape as a weapon of war.

The association's work has been featured in documentary programmes produced by the BBC and Al-Jazeera.

== See also ==
- Vilina Vlas
