= Mehmed Paša Sokolović Bridge =

Historic bridge in Višegrad, Bosnia and Herzegovina

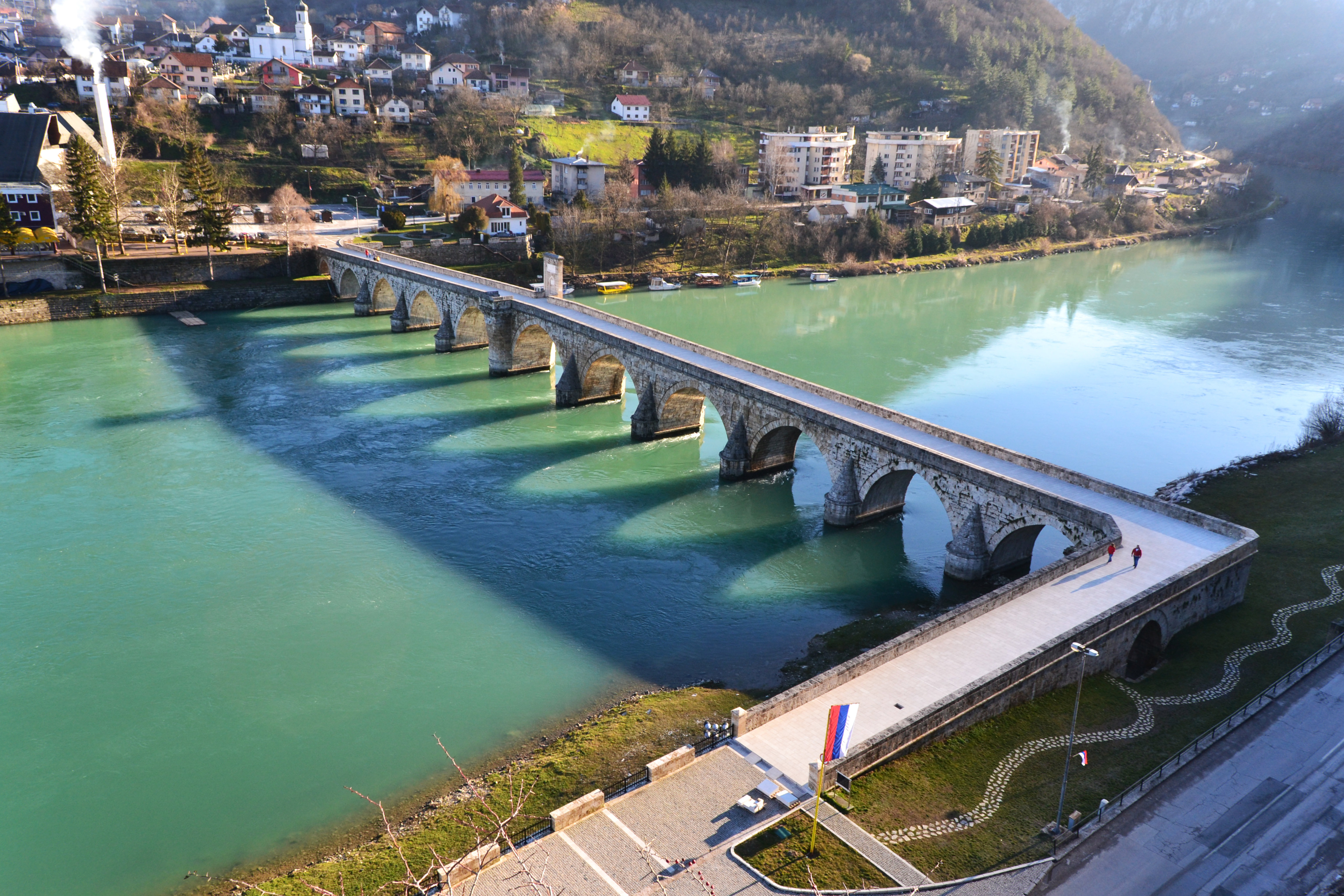
- Coordinates: 43°47′N 19°17′E
- Crosses: Drina River
- Locale: Višegrad, Republika Srpska, Bosnia and Herzegovina
- Official name: Most Mehmed-paše Sokolovića
- Heritage status

KONS of Bosnia and Herzegovina
- Official name: Mehmed paša Sokolovic Bridge, the historical monument
- Type: Category 0 cultural-historical and natural monument
- Criteria: A, B, C i.ii.iii.iv.v.vi., D iii.iv., E iii.v., F i.ii.iii., G i.ii.iii.iv.v.vi., H ii.iii.
- Designated: 4 March 2003 (session no. 08.2-6-101/03-5)
- Reference no.: 769
- List: List of National Monuments of Bosnia and Herzegovina

Characteristics
- Design: Arch
- Material: Limestone
- Total length: 179.5 metres
- Traversable?: pedestrian
- No. of spans: 11

History
- Architect: Mimar Sinan
- Constructed by: Sokollu Mehmed Pasha
- Opened: 1577; 449 years ago

Statistics
- Daily traffic: pedestrian

UNESCO World Heritage Site
- Official name: Mehmed Paša Sokolović Bridge in Višegrad
- Type: Cultural
- Criteria: ii, iv
- Designated: 2007 (31st session)
- Reference no.: 1260
- Region: Europe and North America

Location
- Interactive map of Mehmed Paša Sokolović Bridge

The Mehmed Paša Sokolović Bridge (Serbian: Мост Мехмед-паше Соколовића, romanized: Most Mehmed-paše Sokolovića) is a historic bridge over the Drina River in Višegrad, in the Republika Srpska region of Bosnia and Herzegovina. It was completed in 1577 by the Ottoman court architect Mimar Sinan on the order of the Grand Vizier Mehmed Paša Sokolović. In 2003 bridge was included into the List of National Monuments of Bosnia and Herzegovina by KONS, and UNESCO inclusion into the World Heritage List followed in 2007.

== Characteristics ==
The bridge is characteristic of the apogee of Turkish monumental architecture and civil engineering. It comprises 11 masonry arches, with spans of 11 to 15 meters, and a right-angled approach ramp on the west bank of the river.

The 179.5-meter-long (589 ft) bridge was designed by Mimar Sinan, one of the greatest architects and engineers of the classical Ottoman period and a contemporary of the Italian Renaissance. The UNESCO summary states: The unique elegance of proportion and monumental nobility of the property as a whole bear witness to the greatness of this style of architecture.

== History ==
The Višegrad Bridge was commissioned by Grand Vizier Mehmed Pasha Sokolović, who exercised power over a long period at the summit of the Ottoman Empire during the reigns of three sultans, as a tribute to his native region and a symbol of trade and prosperity. Construction of the bridge took place between 1571 and 1577. Major renovations of the bridge have taken place in 1664, 1875, 1911, 1940 and 1950–52. Three of its 11 arches were destroyed during World War I and five were damaged during World War II but subsequently restored.

=== Renovation ===
The bridge received UNESCO World Heritage Listing in 2007.

The Turkish International Co-operation and Development Agency (TIKA) provided 3.5 million euros for the restoration of the Mehmed Paša Sokolović Bridge. Representatives of TIKA, the BiH Commission for Co-operation with UNESCO, the Republika Srpska Cultural Ministry and the Višegrad municipality signed an agreement to renovate the bridge on 19 April 2010.

== In literature ==
The bridge is widely known because of the 1945 book The Bridge on the Drina, by Nobel Prize–winning Yugoslav writer Ivo Andrić.

== Gallery ==
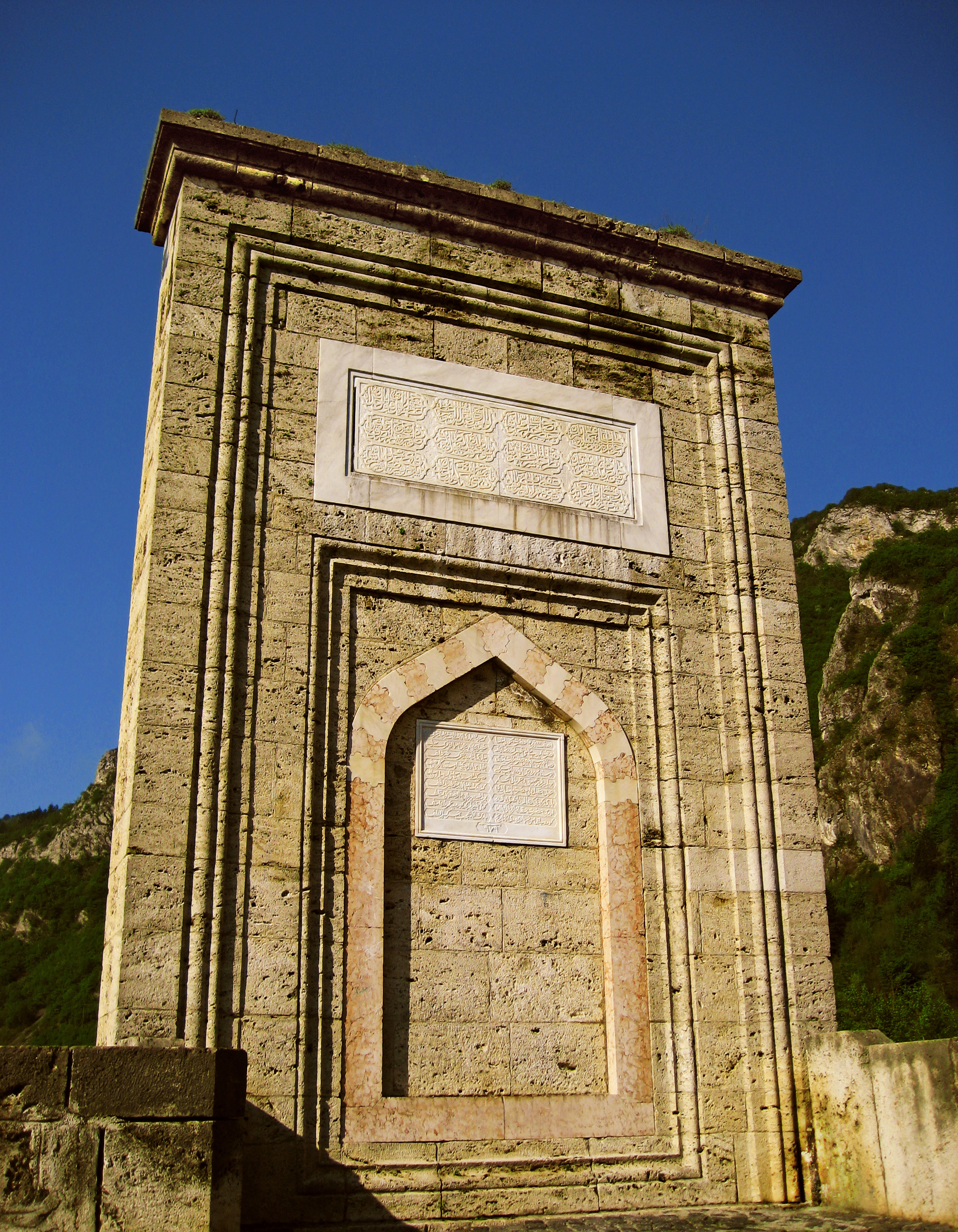
The central pier of the bridge

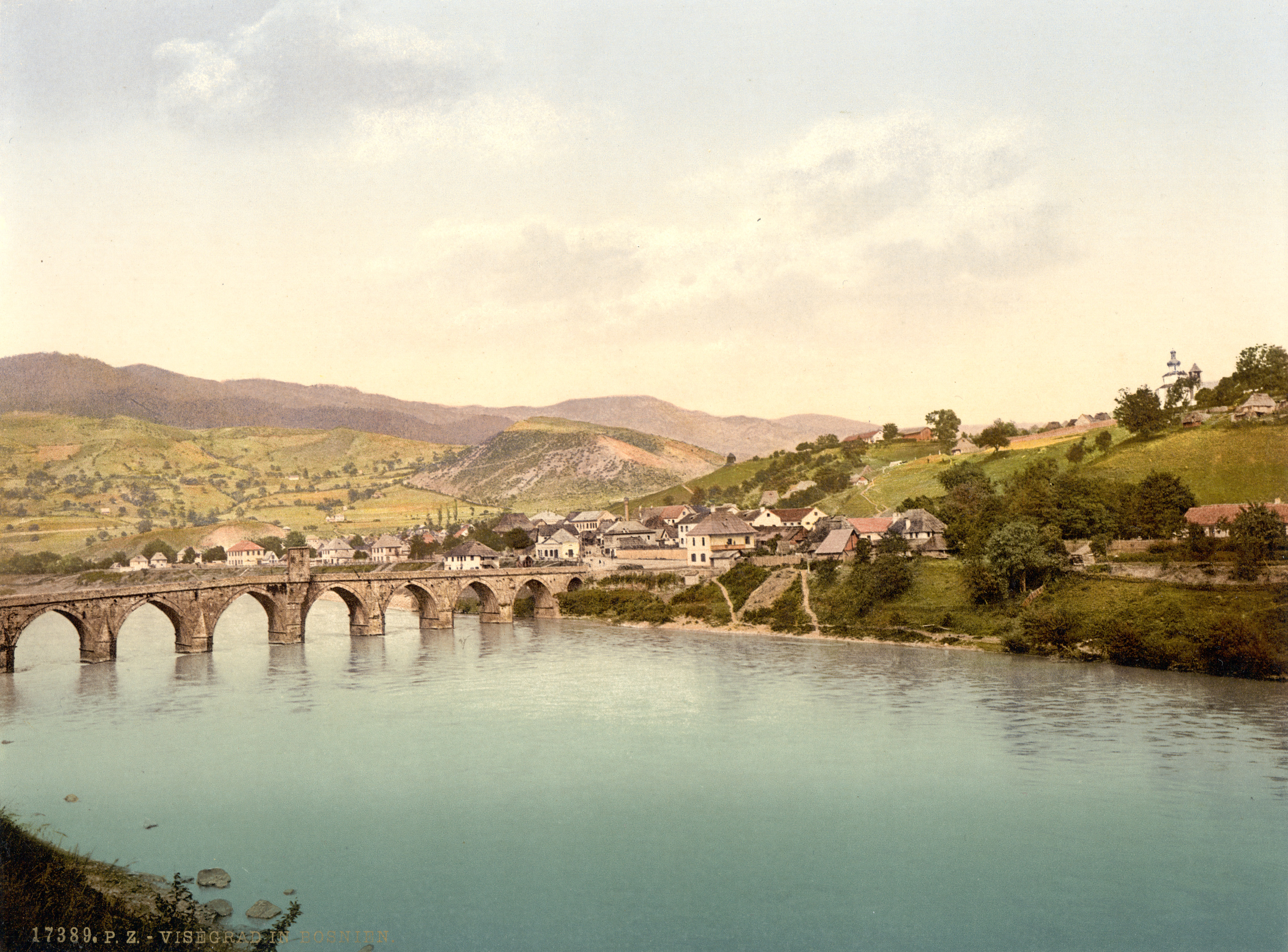
View of the bridge, circa 1890

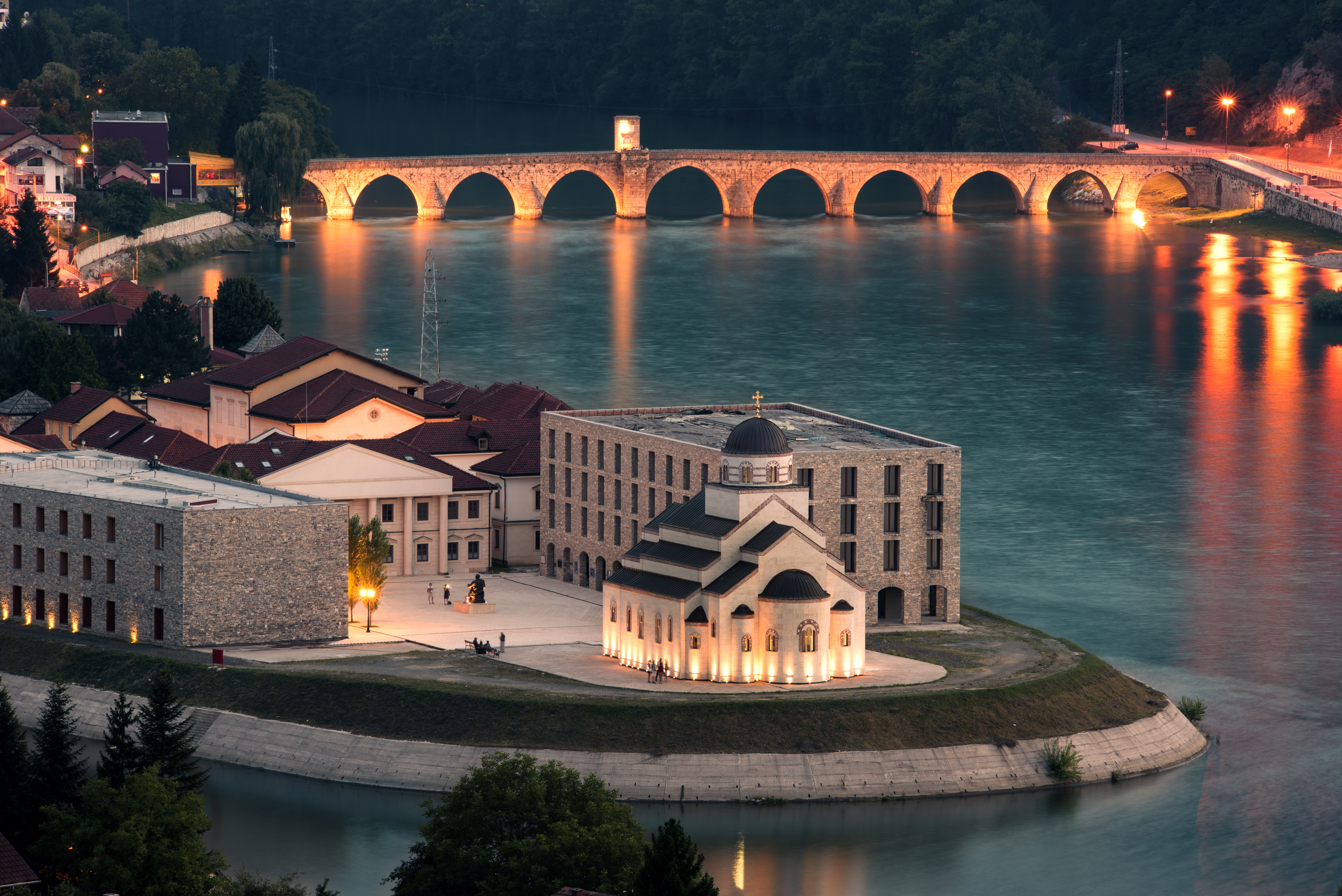
Andrićgrad and Mehmed Paša Sokolović Bridge

== See also ==
- List of World Heritage Sites in Bosnia and Herzegovina
- Višegrad massacres

== Relevant literature ==
- Ševo, Ljiljana. "Stari Višegradski most u narodnoj tradiciji, putopisima i umjetnosti." Baština II (2006): 173-191.
