= Mitar Vasiljević =

Bosnian Serb (1954–2023)

- Born: 25 August 1954; Đurevići, Višegrad, PR Bosnia and Herzegovina, FPR Yugoslavia
- Died: 5 November 2023 (aged 69); Višegrad, Bosnia and Herzegovina

Mitar Vasiljević (Serbian Cyrillic: Митар Васиљевић; 25 August 1954 – 5 November 2023) was a Bosnian Serb who was convicted of crimes against humanity and violation of the laws or customs of war by the International Criminal Tribunal for the Former Yugoslavia (ICTY) for his actions in the Višegrad region during the Bosnian War. He was a member of Milan Lukić's White Eagles paramilitary group.

Vasiljević was arrested by members of the Stabilisation Force in Bosnia and Herzegovina on January 25, 2000. Vasiljević was charged with six counts of crimes against humanity and four counts of violations of the customs of war, all of which he pleaded not guilty to. While he was originally scheduled to be tried along with Milan and Sredoje Lukić, his case proceeded on its own as the others were still at large at the time.

Vasiljević was found guilty of crimes against humanity and violations of the customs of war and was sentenced to twenty years' imprisonment, which was reduced to fifteen years on appeal. He was incarcerated in Austria.

On 12 March 2010, Vasiljević was granted early release. He died in Višegrad on 5 November 2023, at the age of 69.

== See also ==
- Višegrad massacres
- Uzamnica camp
- Milan Lukić
