= Milan Lukić =

Bosnian Serb war criminal (born 1967)

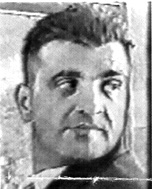
- Lukić during the Bosnian War
- Born: 6 September 1967 (age 59); Foča, SR Bosnia and Herzegovina, Yugoslavia
- Military career
- Allegiance: White Eagles
- Criminal information
- Relatives: Sredoje Lukić
- Convictions: war crimes, murder, crimes against humanity
- Penalty: Life imprisonment

Details
- Victims: 132+
- Span of crimes: 1992–?
- Country: Bosnia and Herzegovina
- Location: Višegrad
- Date apprehended: 8 August 2005
- Imprisoned at: Tartu prison

Milan Lukić (Serbian Cyrillic: Милан Лукић; born 6 September 1967) is the former leader of the Bosnian Serb paramilitary force the White Eagles that operated during the Bosnian War. He was found guilty by the International Criminal Tribunal for the Former Yugoslavia (ICTY) in July 2009 of crimes against humanity and violations of war customs committed in the Višegrad municipality of Bosnia and Herzegovina during the Bosnian war and sentenced to life in prison.

The crimes of which Lukić was convicted include murder, torture, assault, looting, destruction of property and the killing of at least 132 identified men, women and children. Lukić's cousin, Sredoje Lukić, and a close family friend Mitar Vasiljević were also convicted by the ICTY and sentenced to 30 years and 15 years in prison, respectively.

Among the crimes in and around Višegrad for which Lukić and the unit under his command were held responsible were the Pionirska street fire and the Bikavac fire which, the ICTY Trial Chamber observed, exemplified the worst acts of inhumanity that a person may inflict upon others and "ranked high in the long, sad and wretched history of man's inhumanity to man". Lukić was only the second individual to be sentenced by the tribunal to life imprisonment, in 2006.

Lukić was also responsible for the Sjeverin and Štrpci massacres, in which non-Serb citizens of Serbia and Montenegro were abducted and then murdered on Bosnian territory. The failure of the Serbian authorities to conduct an adequate investigation remains a significant political issue in Serbia. In a 1992 interview with the Belgrade magazine Duga, in which he confessed to some of his crimes, Lukić said, "I don't have a guilty conscience over any of them."

== Early life and work ==
Milan Lukić was born on 6 September 1967 in Foča in the Socialist Republic of Bosnia and Herzegovina, a constituent republic of the Socialist Federal Republic of Yugoslavia. His parents are Mile and Kata Lukić, and his parents had two other sons, Gojko and Novica, and one daughter, Draginja. Milan grew up in the village of Rujište, about 15 km (9.3 mi) north of the town of Višegrad. From 1974 onwards he attended primary school in the village of Klašnik for four years, then Prelovo for a further four years. In 1982 he was registered as attending the Ivo Andrić school in Višegrad first studying hospitality, then metallurgy. His study and work activities immediately after this are not clear, but it is known that he worked as a bartender and lived in both Offenbach am Main in Germany and Zurich in Switzerland. During the Bosnian War Milan lived with his parents and a brother on Pionirska Street in Višegrad, but may have lived in the nearby village of Šeganje for a period in 1992.

== Crimes during the Bosnian war ==
=== Višegrad massacres ===
On 19 May 1992 the JNA Užice Corps officially withdrew from the town and local Serb leaders established the Serbian Municipality of Višegrad, taking control of all municipal government offices. Soon after, local Serbs, police and paramilitaries began one of the most notorious campaigns of ethnic cleansing in the conflict, designed to permanently rid the town of its Bosniak population.

Serb forces attacked and destroyed a number of Bosniak villages. A large number of Bosniak civilians in the town of Višegrad were killed. The Drina River was used to dump many of the bodies of the Bosniak men, women and children killed around the town and on the historic Turkish bridge crossing the Drina. Serb forces were implicated in the systematic looting and destruction of Bosniak homes and villages. Both of the town's mosques were completely destroyed. Many of the Bosniaks who were not immediately killed were detained at various locations in the town, as well as the former JNA military barracks at Uzamnica (5 kilometres outside of Višegrad), the Vilina Vlas Hotel and other detention sites in the area. Those detained at Uzamnica were subjected to inhumane conditions, including regular beatings, torture by Bosnian Serbs and strenuous forced labour.

Ethnic cleansing was carried out on orders from the Bosnian Serb leader Radovan Karadžić and the military commander General Ratko Mladić and as elsewhere in Bosnia, persecution and mass murder was overseen by a local Bosnian Serb "Crisis Committee", under the presidency of Branimir Savović.

Milan Lukić returned to Višegrad in 1992 after working abroad for a time before the war in Germany and Switzerland.

Lukić said he returned from Zurich when the fighting began in Visegrad to join a unit organised by his cousin Sredoje, and Niko Vujačić. Lukić was responsible for organising a group of local paramilitaries referred to variously as the White Eagles, the Avengers or the Wolves, with ties to the Višegrad police and Serb military units. The group committed numerous crimes in the Višegrad municipality including murder, rape, torture, beatings, looting and destruction of property, and played a prominent role in the ethnic cleansing of the town and surrounding area of its Bosniak inhabitants. These crimes included two particular crimes of which it was observed by the ICTY Trial Chamber in the summary of its conclusions in the Lukić cousins' trial that "The Pionirska street fire and the Bikavac fire exemplify the worst acts of inhumanity that a person may inflict upon others."

=== Sjeverin massacre ===
On the morning of 22 October 1992, a bus travelling from Priboj, Sandžak, Serbia to Rudo, Bosnia, was stopped in the Bosnian village of Mioče by four members of the Osvetnici (Avengers) paramilitary unit under the command of Milan Lukić. The other members of the group were Oliver Krsmanović, Dragutin Dragicević, and Đorđe Sević. 16 Bosniak passengers from Sjeverin - 15 men and one woman, all Yugoslavian and/or Serbian citizens - were taken off the bus and forced onto a truck. They were taken to Višegrad, which was under the control of the Bosnian Serb Army, to the Vilina Vlas hotel. The hostages were severely beaten and tortured inside the hotel and then taken to the edge of the Drina river, where they were executed.

Shortly after the abduction, Lukić was stopped by Serbian police when driving through Sjeverin and found in possession of weapons and forging personal documents. He was charged, but released from custody. In October 2002, after the fall of Slobodan Milošević, indictments were issued against Milan Lukić and others. Witness protection proved problematic in the trial. On 29 September 2003, Dragićević, Krsmanović, and Lukić were found guilty of the torture and murder of the abductees; Krsmanović and Lukić were convicted in absentia.

=== Štrpci massacre ===
On 27 February 1993 members of the Serbian "Avengers" ("Osvetnici") military unit, commanded by Milan Lukić, abducted a group of 19 non-Serb citizens of the Republics of Serbia and Montenegro (18 Bosniaks and one Croat) from the Belgrade-Bar train at Štrpci station near Priboj. The abductees were robbed and physically abused, then tortured and killed in the garage of a burned-out house in the village of Visegradska banja, near Višegrad, close to the Drina river. Their remains have not been found.

At the trial of Nebojša Ranisavljević, the only suspect convicted for the crime, Luka Dragicević, Commander of the Višegrad brigade of the Republika Srpska Army (RSA), admitted the "Avengers" unit were part of these armed forces. Dragicević transferred after the war to a position in the FRY Army. Police and judicial officials in Serbia are alleged to have obstructed court proceedings against Milan Lukić.

== During the war ==
Immediately following the abductions the local people in Sjeverin were subjected to further intimidation by Milan Lukić. In the absence of effective action by the Serbian authorities the remaining Bosniak inhabitants of Sjeverin fled to Priboj.

Four days after the abductions Serbian police stopped Milan Lukić driving through Sjeverin. Lukić produced a forged ID and driver's licence, issued by the Višegrad police. The police found weapons and ammunition in the car. Lukić and Dragutin Dragićević were charged with illegal possession of weapons and forging personal documents. After a visit to the area by Radmilo Bogdanović, president of the Defense and Security Committee of the Yugoslav Parliament's Chamber of Citizens, an influential figure in Serbian police circles, Lukić and Dragicević were released from custody on grounds that lacked transparency.

Milan Lukić was arrested by the Serbian police in 1993 on suspicion of having murdered a resident of Višegrad on Serbian territory. In 1994 he was again arrested on suspicion of being the commander of the group that abducted a group of mainly Bosnian Muslim passengers from the Belgrade-Bar train at Štrpci station and then killed them. Each time the investigation was stopped and Lukić was released.

== Post-war ==
After the war, Lukić allegedly was involved in a variety of criminal rackets operating across the porous border between Serbia and Republika Srpska.

In 1998, ICTY prosecutors charged him with 11 counts of crimes against humanity and nine other counts of violations of the laws or customs of war. For a long time he lived quite openly and was often seen around Višegrad and in Serbia, where he owned an apartment in Belgrade. Serb and Bosnian Serb authorities took no action to hand Lukić over to the ICTY, as extradition was against constitution at the time. However, he was repeatedly charged with racketeering and other organised crime offences and arrested three times by Serbian police during the 1990s on charges including illegal possession of firearms, forging of documents and the murder of a Serb from Višegrad who had helped Bosnian Muslims flee the town. Each time he was released.

Lukić was linked to Radovan Karadžić as part of a drug-smuggling ring connected to Karadžić's business network whose profits funded the "Preventiva" network that protected Karadžić and provided Lukić with cover. Lukić's cousin, Sreten Lukić, deputy interior minister of Serbia, in charge of the Serbian police, also helped protect him. In October 2002, after the fall of Milošević, the Office of the Public Prosecutor in Belgrade issued indictments against Lukić, Dragutin Dragićević, Oliver Krsmanović, Đorđe Šević, and five other persons on charges relating to the Sjeverin massacre.

In 2003 an ICTY official confirmed that Lukic had been discussing the possibility of surrender for several years and contacts with The Hague intensified as the relationship with Karadžić deteriorated. However an attempt to set up a meeting between Lukić and representatives of the ICTY in April 2004 culminated in Milan's brother, Novica Lukić, being shot dead during a raid on the Lukić family home in Visegrad by Republika Srpska Interior Ministry special forces.

== Trial in absentia for the Sjeverin massacre ==
On 29 September 2003, Dragutin Dragićević, Oliver Krsmanović and Milan Lukić were found guilty of the torture and murder of the abductees and sentenced to 20 years imprisonment (the latter two in absentia) while Đorđe Šević was sentenced to 15 years. Witness protection had proved problematic in the trial. The convictions were the first secured following the appointment of a Serbian special war crimes prosecutor in July 2003.

== Disappearance ==
In January 2004, Lukić quarreled with Karadžić's armed bodyguards and was reportedly injured in a shootout over his share of the proceeds from a particular drugs shipment. By the time a report was published in April 2004 by Institute for War and Peace Reporting (IWPR) and Balkan Investigative Reporting Network linking him to Radovan Karadžić, Lukić had vanished.

In April 2005, in a letter e-mailed to Bosnian and Serbian media outlets apparently written by Lukić, the author called for his superiors, the top police, military and political leaders from Višegrad, to be held to account for crimes committed under their command. In the e-mail, traced to a server in Brazil, Lukić denied that he was a traitor to Karadžić, as his former superiors were claiming in what he claimed was a "shameless and unscrupulous lie". He declared that "Mladić has always been and will remain the true hero and idol, and Karadžić, the leader of my people".

== Arrest and transfer to The Hague for trial ==
In August 2005 Lukić was arrested in Buenos Aires, Argentina. He told the Argentine judges that he had been in Brazil and admitted entering Argentina on a false passport in the name of Goran Đukanović. He claimed to have been preparing to surrender to The Hague, implying that this was for his own safety. He said that he feared people on his own side, "Karadžić's people". He told the court: "I know lots of things happened during the war, and I was afraid that they would kill me because there are many who do not want it known what happened. As the saying goes: better to be a tongue without a voice."

He was returned to The Hague. On 24 February 2006, he made his initial appearance before the Tribunal and pleaded not guilty to twelve counts of crimes against humanity (persecution, murder [5 counts], inhumane acts [4 counts], extermination [2 counts]) and nine counts of violations of the laws or customs of war (murder [5 counts], cruel treatment [4 counts]). A request by the Prosecution to have Lukić's case referred to the national authorities of Bosnia and Herzegovina was ultimately denied by the Appeals Chamber of the ICTY. On Friday, 20 July 2007, the International Criminal Tribunal for the former Yugoslavia (ICTY) decided to revoke the referral of the Sredoje Lukić case to Bosnia and Herzegovina, clearing the way for it to be tried jointly in The Hague with the case of Milan Lukić. The Lukićs' co-indictee, Mitar Vasiljević, had already been convicted and sentenced for his part in crimes committed in association with Lukić.

== ICTY trial and conviction ==
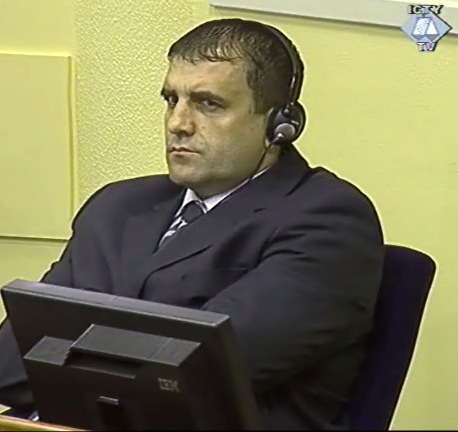
Milan Lukić before the ICTY in The Hague, 2009

Milan Lukić was charged on the basis of individual criminal responsibility (Article 7(1) of the Statute of the Tribunal) with:

- Persecutions on political, racial and religious grounds; murder; inhumane acts; and extermination (crimes against humanity, Article 5)
- Murder; and cruel treatment (violations of laws or customs of war, Article 3)

On 20 July 2009 judgment was handed down in Case IT-98-32 against Lukić and Sredoje Lukić by the International Criminal Tribunal's Trial Chamber III, judges Patrick Robinson (Presiding), Christine Van Den Wyngaert and Pedro David.

The Trial Chamber found Milan Lukić guilty on all charges, convicting him, on the basis of individual criminal responsibility (Article 7 (1) of the Statute of the Tribunal), of:

- Persecutions on political, racial and religious grounds (crimes against humanity, Article 5);
- Murder (crimes against humanity, Article 5);
- Murder (violations of the laws and customs of war, Article 3);
- Inhumane acts (crimes against humanity, Article 5);
- Cruel treatment (violations of the laws and customs of war, Article 3);

The Chamber, by majority, with Judge Van Den Wyngaert dissenting, also convicted Milan Lukić of:

- Extermination (crimes against humanity, Article 5)

The specific crimes, committed as part of a widespread and systematic attack against the Bosnian Muslim civilians of the municipality of Visegrad and its surrounding area, included the following:

- Milan Lukić led seven Bosnian Muslim men to a site on the bank of the Drina river, near Višegrad, forced them to line up along the bank, and then shot them, killing five of the men.
- He forced seven Bosnian Muslim men from the Varda sawmill and furniture factory in Višegrad to go to the bank of the Drina river, and then shot them repeatedly, killing all seven men.
- He murdered approximately 70 Bosnian Muslim women, children and elderly men in a house on Pionirska Street in Višegrad by barricading the victims in one room of the house, setting the house on fire and then firing automatic weapons at those people who tried to escape through the windows, killing some and injuring others.
- He murdered approximately 70 Bosnian Muslim women, children and elderly men in a house in the village of Bikavac, near Višegrad, by forcing the victims into the house, barricading all the exits and throwing in several explosive devices.
- He brutally murdered a Bosnian Muslim woman in the Potok neighbourhood of Višegrad.
- He beat, on multiple occasions, Bosnian Muslim men who were detained in the detention camp at the Uzamnica military barracks in Višegrad.

Lukić's defense claimed he was a victim of "rumors" and mistaken identity claiming witnesses had misidentified him. Lukić was found guilty and sentenced to life imprisonment. His cousin Sredoje Lukić was found guilty of crimes including aiding and abetting the murders at Pionirska Street and was sentenced to 30 years imprisonment.

=== ICTY failure to prosecute crimes of rape ===
The Association of Women Victims of War, representing Višegrad rape victims, expressed anger at the ICTY's failure to prosecute Milan Lukić for rape and rapes committed under his authority. The Association's head, Bakira Hasečić, who has described how she herself was raped at knifepoint by Lukić in a basement of the Višegrad police station, claimed rape victims were let down by the failure of the ICTY to charge either Milan Lukić or Sredoje Lukić with rape or sexual abuse.

The Vilina Vlas spa hotel on the outskirts of Višegrad was used as a rape camp while it was also the Lukićs' unit's command post. One woman stated that Lukić raped her several times while she was one of a reported 200 women held in the Vilina Vlas spa hotel. This was after he had earlier raped her in her own home, slaughtered her 16-year-old son with a knife, and then raped her again in the garden. She believed only a handful of the women survived the camp as most were killed or took their own lives. She told Balkan Insight she saw one suicide herself, when a girl jumped from a second-floor room through a glass balcony. The Association of Women Victims of War believes that fewer than ten women prisoners survived.

International human rights organisations and refugees had reported on the atrocities in the town back in 1992. As survivors fled, reports of rape and sexual abuse of women led Amnesty International to publish an extensive report on rape in Bosnia and Herzegovina, mentioning Višegrad as a prime example, and a 1994 UN report on rape in Bosnia and Herzegovina specifically identified Vilina Vlas as one of the locations where the rapes occurred.

It was not until June 2008 that the first trial of one of the Višegrad rapists took place before the State Court of Bosnia and Herzegovina. Zeljko Lelek, charged with crimes against humanity including murders, deportation, forcible detention and rape committed jointly with the Beli Orlovi group, has since been found guilty of rape at Vilina Vlas and other crimes alongside Milan Lukić. Alexandra Stiglmayer, author of Mass Rape: The war against women in Bosnia and Herzegovina, gave all her material relating to rapes in Višegrad to an investigator from the ICTY who asked if she would be willing to testify about it in court but she was never asked to do so by the Tribunal. In 1996, The Guardian published extracts from the confession made by a Serb soldier, Mitar Obradović, alleging that Lukić had raped many women in Višegrad and encouraged his troops to do the same.

The ICTY's initial joint indictment against Milan and Sredoje Lukić and Mitar Vasiljević stated that Vilina Vlas had been used to incarcerate prisoners who were tortured, beaten up and sexually abused, though none of the original 20 counts specifically mentioned rape. Witnesses at Vasiljević's subsequent separate trial spoke about the mass rapes that had occurred in Višegrad. Vasiljević told the Tribunal how he had heard that Milan Lukić raped, robbed and murdered many of his victims, including a number of girls Lukić raped after capturing the village of Mušići.

The trial judges who found Vasiljević guilty stated that they believed Vilina Vlas was under Lukić's command in 1992 and in an interview with Belgrade's Duga magazine in 1992, Lukić himself confirmed that he had headed a unit there. Bakira Hasečić challenged the Chief Prosecutor Carla del Ponte's assertion that the prosecution did not have evidence for such charges when it drew up the indictment as no witnesses would come forward, saying she and other women made statements to officials that were available to Hague investigators.

Del Ponte's special advisor and spokesperson Anton Nikiforov acknowledged there was information about rapes that had taken place in Višegrad but claimed tribunal prosecutors had been "unable to reach the witnesses" before the indictments were completed. Del Ponte suggested that the Tribunal might transfer the Lukićs' case to the War Crimes Chamber in Sarajevo and urged Association of Women Victims of War to work with state prosecutors to have the indictments changed there. The UN's "completion strategy" for the tribunal ruled out prosecutors bringing new charges or amending existing ones unless a case was transferred to local courts elsewhere.

On 12 June 2008, less than a month before the trial started, the Prosecution filed a motion for a new indictment, adding rape and sexual slavery to the charges. The proposed new indictment charged the cousins with involvement, individually or together with others, in planning and/or the abetting of rape, keeping in slavery and torture of persons in detention centres and other locations in Višegrad town and its vicinity. One day before the start of the trial, the Trial Chamber rejected the Prosecution's submission, ruling that such an amendment to the indictment would prejudice the right of the accused to have enough time to mount a defence.

== Prison life ==
Lukić had been held at The Hague since 21 February 2006. In February 2014, Lukić was transferred to Tartu Vangla prison in Estonia where he is currently serving his sentence.

In March 2015, Lukić filed a "human rights" complaint requesting to be transferred to Scheveningen detention unit then relocate to a prison in Germany, claiming "psychological pain" from isolation due to his inability to speak Estonian. He also stated the distance from his wife and 1 year old son, who both live in Germany, as a further "aggravating circumstance".

The prosecution requested the Tribunal to dismiss, in its entirety, Lukić's request stating that his human rights have not been violated and he was never "denied the possibility" to communicate or meet with his family, citing 11 family visits in 2014.

In December 2020 the Hague Tribunal rejected a request by Lukić for a revision of his life sentence.

== Confession of a Hague Prisoner ==
On 29 July 2011, the parish house of the Church of Saint Sava in Belgrade hosted an event to promote the launch of Milan Lukić's book the Confession of a Hague Prisoner (Ispovest haškog sužnja) and was attended by several priests of the Serbian Orthodox Church and by many of Lukić's supporters. The Humanitarian Law Center in Belgrade urged that the "institutions and citizens of the Republic of Serbia to condemn publicly the use of the Parish House of the Cathedral of Saint Sava in Belgrade for the launch of a book by the convicted war criminal Milan Lukić during which priests of the Serbian Orthodox Church took part in the eulogisation of a war criminal responsible for some of the most terrible crimes against humanity." The Humanitarian Law Center demanded "that the Patriarch reveal the names of the priests who took part in this public event and explain to the public why a religious building whose construction was paid for by the state and many individual citizens has been used to celebrate a convicted war criminal who burned women and children alive."

Lukić's book was published by the Serbian Radical Party with an initial run of 1,000 copies. A second edition followed shortly thereafter, with a run of 10,000 copies.

On 11 October 2011, the Valjevo Municipal Assembly denied the Serbian Radical Party's request to use the great hall of the local parliament building as a space to promote Lukić's book on the grounds that it was revealed that the book's author was in fact Rajko Đurđević and not Milan Lukić. After the failed request, the Serbian Radical Party promoted the book at Valjevo's city square.

== See also ==
- Višegrad massacres
- Sjeverin massacre
- Vilina Vlas
- Bakira Hasečić
- Štrpci massacre
- Uzamnica camp
- Mitar Vasiljević
- Željko Lelek
- Momir Savić
