= Sredoje Lukić =

Bosnian Serb war criminal (born 1961)

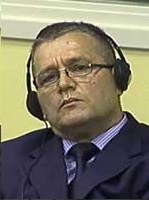
- Sredoje Lukić
- Born: 5 April 1961 (age 65); Rujište, SR Bosnia and Herzegovina, Yugoslavia
- Military career
- Allegiance: White Eagles
- Criminal information
- Relatives: Milan Lukić
- Convictions: war crimes, murder, crimes against humanity
- Penalty: 27 years

Details
- Span of crimes: 1992–?
- Country: Bosnia and Herzegovina
- Location: Višegrad
- Imprisoned at: Norway

Sredoje Lukić (born 5 April 1961, Rujiste, Višegrad, Bosnia and Herzegovina) is a Bosnian Serb former policeman and convicted war criminal.

== Biography ==
Lukić was born on 5 April 1961 in Rujište, Bosnia and Herzegovina. Before and during the Bosnian war, Lukić worked as a policeman in Visegrad. After the war started, he joined his cousin Milan Lukić's group of paramilitaries known as the White Eagles (Beli Orlovi). Milan Lukić and Sredoje Lukić were initially indicted together with Mitar Vasiljević. Sredoje Lukić surrendered to the Bosnian Serb authorities in September 2005. He was transferred to the International Criminal Tribunal for the former Yugoslavia ICTY on 16 September.

In July 2009 after being tried with his cousin he was found guilty by the ICTY of crimes against humanity and violations of war customs committed in the Višegrad municipality of Bosnia and Herzegovina during the Bosnian war.

He was found to have substantially contributed to the deaths of 59 people trapped in the Pionirska Street fire. He had been present at Jusuf Memić's house, and carrying arms, while the robbery and the strip searches were taking place inside and when the women were removed. He was also present during the transfer of victims to Adem Omeragić's house. The ICTY Trial Chamber concluded that there was no reliable evidence he had set the house on fire or shot at the windows as people tried to escape. Nevertheless, although he did not set Adem Omeragić's house on fire himself, he knew what would happen to the group of victims that he helped to herd there. With Judge Patrick Robinson dissenting, the Trial Chamber found that "by his presence and by being armed, Sredoje Lukić substantially contributed to the deaths of the 59 people trapped in the house and that he had aided and abetted the cruel treatment and inhumane acts committed against all the members of the group".

Sredoje Lukić's defence team filed a notice of appeal and its appeal brief. The prosecution also filed a motion of appeal and its appeal briefs requesting that Lukić's sentence be reviewed and lengthened. The Appeals Chamber in 2012 affirmed the sentence of life imprisonment for Milan Lukić, and reduced, Judge Pocar and Judge Liu dissenting, the sentence for Sredoje Lukić from 30 to 27 years of imprisonment.

In relation to the Uzamnica camp, the evidence showed that Milan Lukić and Sredoje Lukić were opportunistic visitors to the camp, which Sredoje visited less frequently than Milan. They both severely and repeatedly kicked and beat detainees with fists, truncheons, sticks and rifle butts. As opportunistic visitors to the camp, they came for no other reason than to inflict violence on the detainees. The extraordinary brutality with which they behaved towards the detainees caused them serious and permanent damage. The ICTY's Trial Chamber observed that the Pionirska street fire was an example of the worst acts of inhumanity that a person was capable of inflicting upon others and "ranked high in the long, sad and wretched history of man's inhumanity to man".
