= Uzamnica camp =

Internment camp in Višegrad, Bosnia and Herzegovina

- Detainment camp
- Location within Republika Srpska Location within Bosnia and Herzegovina
- Coordinates: 43°46′59″N 19°17′33″E
- Location: Višegrad, Bosnia and Herzegovina
- Operated by: JNA forces
- Inmates: Bosniak civilians

Uzamnica camp was an internment camp established in 1992 by the Yugoslav People's Army (JNA) forces housing Bosniak civilian prisoners during the Bosnian War.

Many of the Bosniaks who were not killed in the Višegrad massacres were detained at various locations in the town, including the former JNA military barracks and warehouse at Uzamnica, five kilometres from Višegrad. Some of these detainees were kept at this site for over two years. Serb soldiers raped many women and beat and terrorised non-Serb civilians. Widespread looting and destruction of non-Serb homes and property took place daily and the town's two mosques were destroyed.

== The camp ==
Prisoners detained at Uzamnica were subjected to inhumane conditions. Many were subjected to regular beatings. Army of Republika Srpska were also permitted to enter the camp to beat and torture the prisoners at will. As a result of these assaults, many of the victims suffered serious and permanent injuries. Many prisoners were used for hard forced labour projects. According to survivors interviewed by Ed Vulliamy, the only food provided for the prisoners was pork, which is forbidden in Islam. Each week, convoys of male prisoners would leave the camp, heading into Serbia, never to be seen again.

== Judgements by the International Criminal Tribunal for the former Yugoslavia (ICTY) ==
Milan Lukić, was found guilty of 10 counts of crimes against humanity and nine counts of violations of the laws of war for his alleged involvement in atrocities, including murder, torture, persecution, looting and destruction of property, and was sentenced to life imprisonment on July 20, 2009.

The Trial Chamber found Sredoje Lukić guilty of war crimes and crimes against humanity and sentenced him to 30 years imprisonment.

In relation to the Uzamnica camp, the evidence showed that both Milan Lukić and Sredoje Lukić were opportunistic visitors to the camp, although Sredoje Lukić came to the camp less frequently than Milan Lukić. When at the camp, both Milan Lukić and Sredoje Lukić severely and repeatedly kicked and beat the detainees with their fists, truncheons, sticks and rifle butts. Several victims testified before the Trial Chamber about these brutal beatings and the grave and permanent injuries they sustained and the suffering they endured.

== See also ==
- Internment camps in the Bosnian War
