= Romanija (disambiguation) =

Romanija is a mountain and geographical region in Republika Srpska, Bosnia and Herzegovina.

Romanija may also refer to:

- Ravna Romanija, a village in the municipality of Sokolac, Republika Srpska, Bosnia and Herzegovina
- SAO Romanija

== See also ==
- Podromanija, a village in the municipality of Sokolac, Republika Srpska, Bosnia and Herzegovina
- Romania (disambiguation)
