= Romania (disambiguation) =

Romania is a country located in Central and Eastern Europe.

Romania or Rumania may also refer to:

- Romania (European Parliament constituency)
- Empire of Romania or Latin Empire, a Crusader state set up after the Fourth Crusade conquered the city-state of Constantinople
- Kingdom of Romania, a constitutional monarchy in southeastern Europe from 1881 to 1947
  - Greater Romania, the borders of the Kingdom of Romania during the interwar period
- Socialist Republic of Romania, a socialist Soviet satellite state that existed during the Cold War period
- Byzantine Empire or Romania (in Greek, Ῥωμανία) (or Rhomania), the continuation of the Roman Empire in the East during Late Antiquity and the Middle Ages
- Roman Empire, also called Romania since the 4th century, as indicated by texts
- Romania (train), a Bucharest-Sofia passenger train
- ST Rumania, a British tugboat previously named Empire Susan
- Roumania Peters (1917–2003), American amateur tennis player
- Roumania, Roumania, a popular, nostalgic song in Yiddish by Aaron Lebedeff

== See also ==
- Category:National sports teams of Romania, teams called "Romania"
- Romance languages
- Romanija, a geographical region in eastern Bosnia and Herzegovina
- Romanija (disambiguation)
