= Serb Autonomous Regions =

Ethnic Serb autonomous entities in Croatia and Bosnia during the Breakup of Yugoslavia

Serbs in SFR Yugoslavia in 1981

From August 1990 to November 1991, during the breakup of Yugoslavia, several Serb Autonomous Regions (also known as Serb Autonomous Districts or Oblasts; sing. Serbian: Српска аутономна област [САО], romanized: Srpska autonomna oblast, SAO) were proclaimed by the SDS in the Yugoslav republics of Croatia and Bosnia-Herzegovina in light of the possible secession of the republics from the Socialist Federal Republic of Yugoslavia.

These self-proclaimed Serb-inhabited entities later united within their respective unrecognized republics, forming the Republic of Serbian Krajina in Croatia and Republika Srpska Bosna i Hercegovina in Bosnia and Herzegovina.

== SAOs in Croatia ==
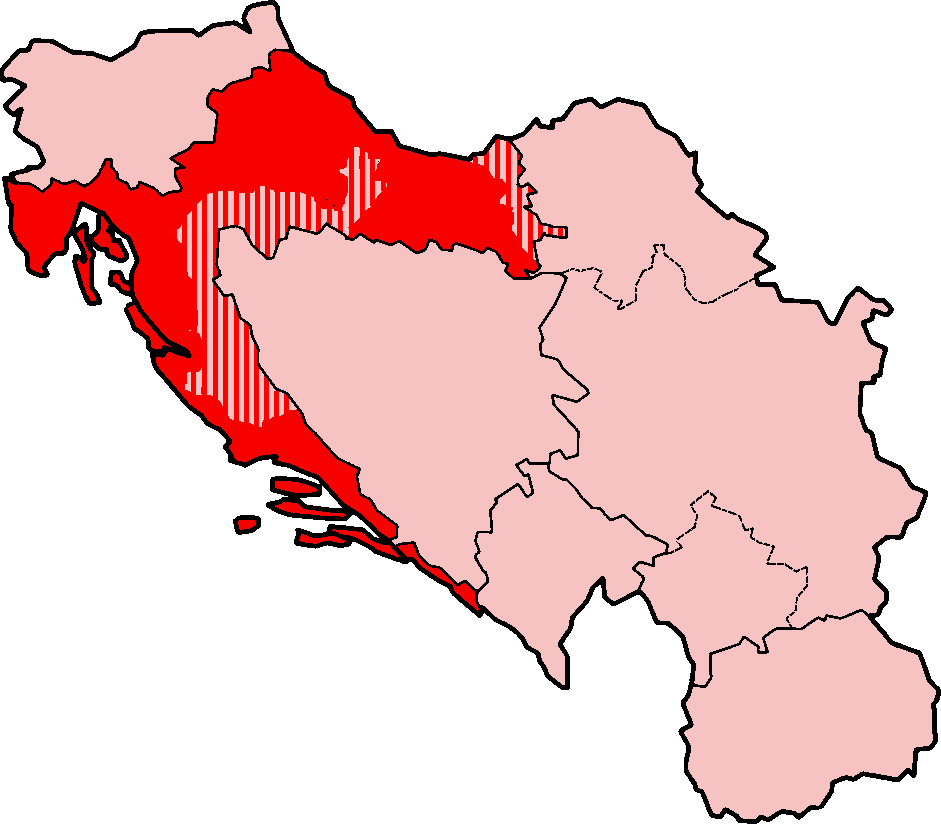
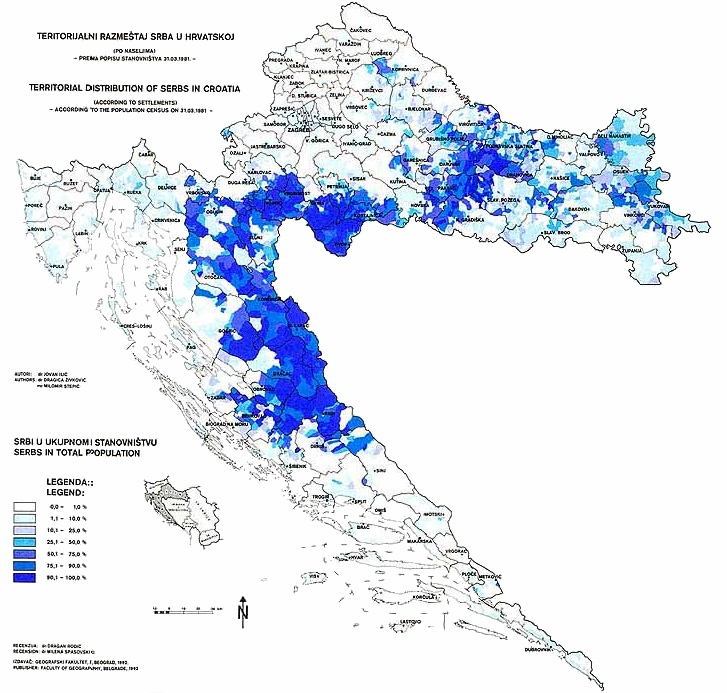
First map: Croatia, Yugoslavia, Serb Autonomous Regions
Second map: Serbs of Croatia per settlement in 1981 census

The so-called anti-bureaucratic revolution of Serbian leader Slobodan Milošević aimed at strengthening of Yugoslav federal institutions triggered condemnations and separatist response in Slovenia and Croatia. This in turn provoked security dilemma among at the time numerous Serbs of Croatia community which strongly opposed any move towards Croatian independence if it will separate them from the other parts of Yugoslavia. The dilemma was rooted in historical experience of the Genocide of Serbs in the Independent State of Croatia stirred up by rising Serb and Croat nationalism. Croatian Serb political leaders of the nationalist Serb Democratic Party advocated for the partition of Croatia in case of independence which would enable Serb inhabited areas to remain in Yugoslavia.

Croatian Serb politician Jovan Rašković argued for the creation of the "integral region" by bringing together predominantly Serb municipalities in Croatia into an Association of Municipalities which would act as one of the first-level administrative units within the republic. While the Croatian legal system at the time formally permitted such a form of municipal organization the move was perceived as highly controversial and led to some of the first clashes.

The first such association was formed around the town of Knin leading to the establishment of SAO Krajina on 21 December 1990. SAO Eastern Slavonia, Baranja and Western Syrmia was formed on 25 June 1991 while SAO Western Slavonia was formed on 12 August 1991. On 19 December 1991, the SAO Krajina proclaimed itself the Republic of Serbian Krajina with SAO Western Slavonia and SAO Eastern Slavonia, Baranja and Western Syrmia joining it subsequently. At that stage the self-proclaimed autonomy was transformed into request for full independence with political leadership subsequently rejecting any autonomy proposal with notable case including Z-4 Plan. At the same time both the Government of Croatia and international mediators now contemplated peace settlements that would indeed include the establishment of some sort of predominantly Serb autonomous regions within Croatia. With the creation of new Croatian counties on 30 December 1992, the Croatian government also set aside two autonomous regions (kotar) for ethnic Serbs in the areas of Krajina known as the Autonomous District of Glina and Autonomous District of Knin. After Operation Storm, the application of the law which allowed autonomy would be temporarily suspended. In 2000 this part of the law was formally repealed.

The process of creation of the self-proclaimed Serb Autonomous Regions in Croatia included inter-ethnic clashes and violence as well as widespread ethnic cleansing of non-Serb population from the areas that those regions ended up controlling. Some of the highest ranking political and military leaders involved in this process were prosecuted by the International Criminal Tribunal for the former Yugoslavia for their direct or command responsibility for a number of war crimes committed. The ICTY appeals processes later adjudicated the existence of a joint criminal enterprise in this regard. In the effort to preserve the peace in the region, European Community limited the recognition of post-Yugoslav entities exclusively to previously established Yugoslav federal units (republics) in their administrative borders and explicitly discouraged it in case of any new secessionist region while at the same time it conditioned recognition of republics with credible minority rights guarantees. Serb Autonomous Regions in Croatia therefore failed to ever gain any formal international recognition.

== SAOs in Bosnia and Herzegovina ==
The Serb Democratic Party established SAOs in Serb-inhabited territories. Between September–November 1991, six entities had been proclaimed. The Serbs set up their own parliament, having left the Bosnian parliament in October 1991. The Serb parliament proclaimed the "Serb Republic" (Republika Srpska) on 27 March 1992.

- SAO Bosnian Krajina, (first formed as the Autonomous Region of Krajina) in April 1991. It was the largest region, but after failure to merge with SAO Krajina in Croatia, it was renamed SAO Bosanska Krajina in September 1991.
- SAO North-East Bosnia formed in September 1991; renamed SAO Semberija in November 1991, and SAO Semberija i Majevica in December 1991.
- SAO Northern Bosnia or SAO Ozren-Posavina, formed in November 1991, never fully controlled its proclaimed territory, because it included predominantly Bosniak and Croat municipalities.
- SAO Romanija, formed in September 1991, and SAO Birač, formed November 1991; combined in November 1991 as SAO Romanija-Birač.
- SAO Herzegovina (also known as SAO Eastern Herzegovina), formed in September 1991.
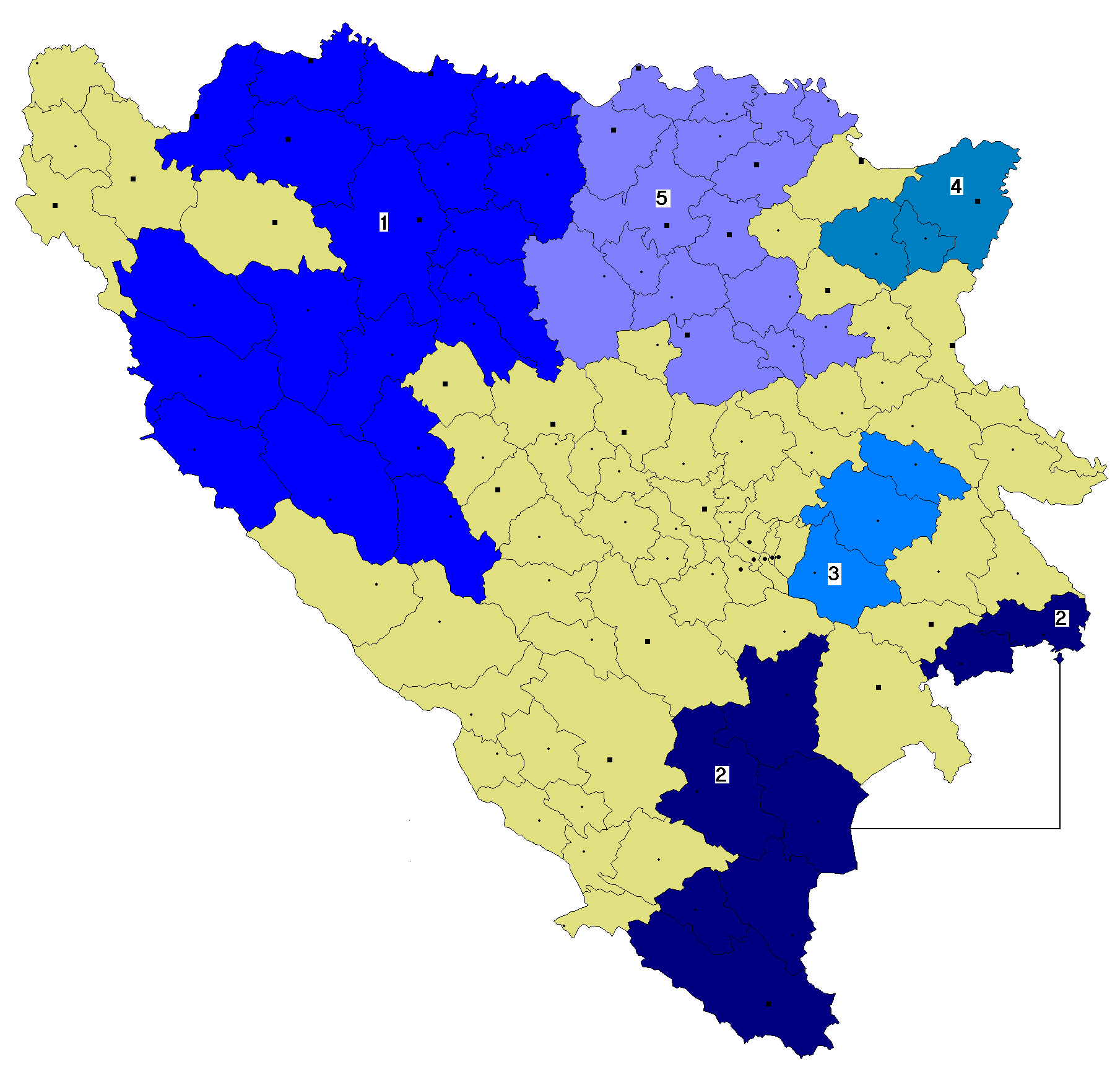
SAOs in Bosnia and Herzegovina (Autumn 1991)

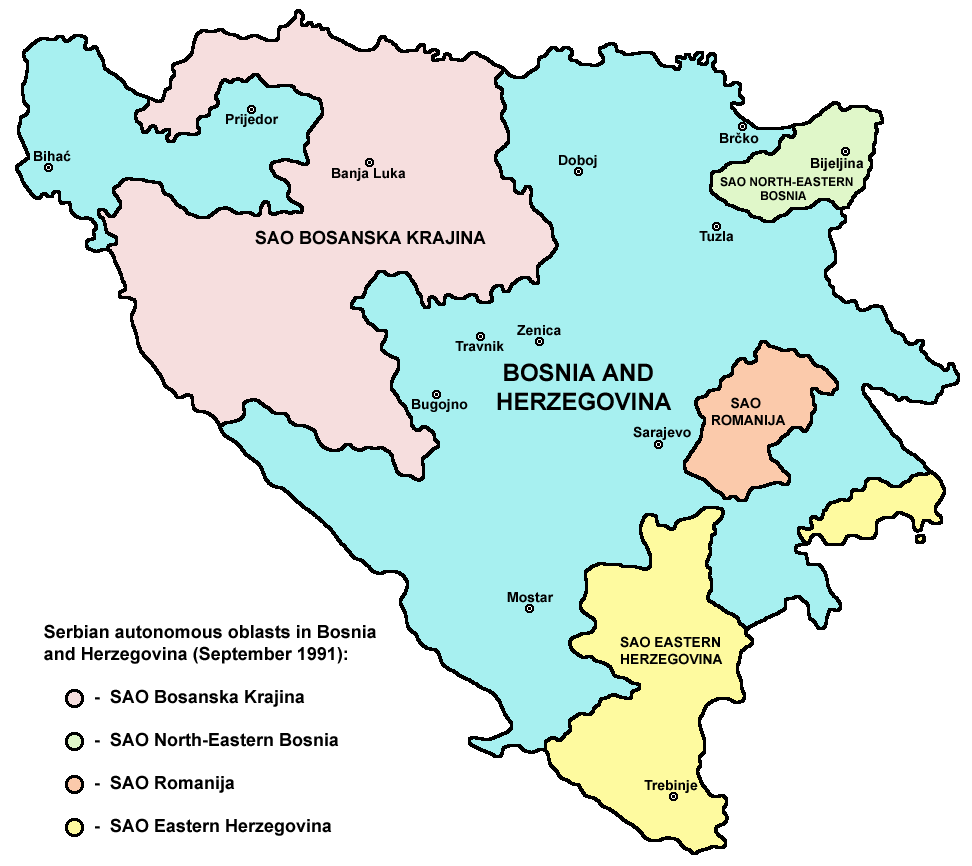
SAOs in Bosnia and Herzegovina (September 1991)

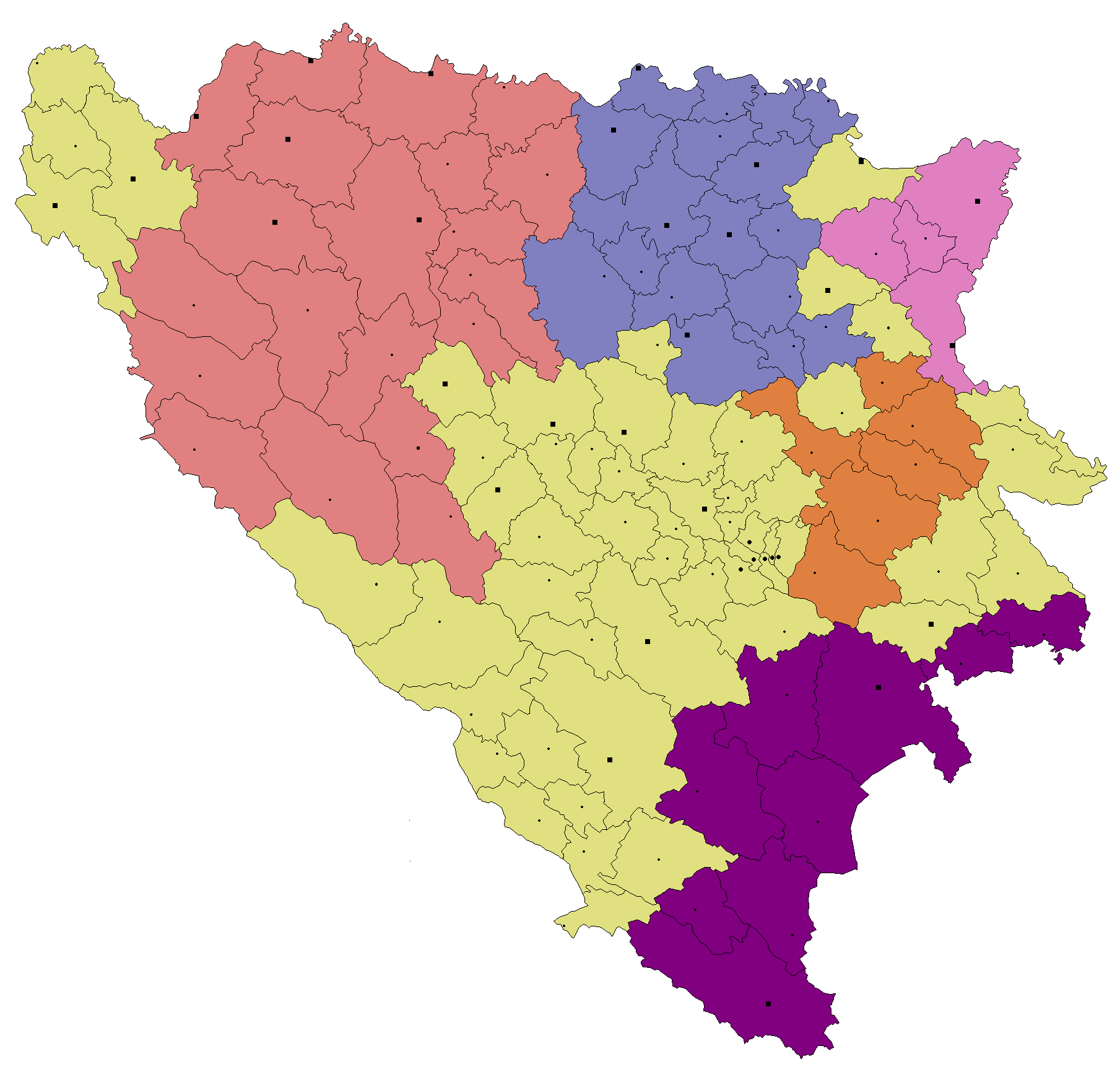
SAOs in Bosnia and Herzegovina (November 1991)

== See also ==
- Self-determination
- Quasi-state
- Separatism
- Polish National Territorial Region
- Autonomous Province of Western Bosnia
- Autonomous Administration of North and East Syria
- Wa State
