= Ravna Romanija =

Ravna Romanija Равна Романија
- Village
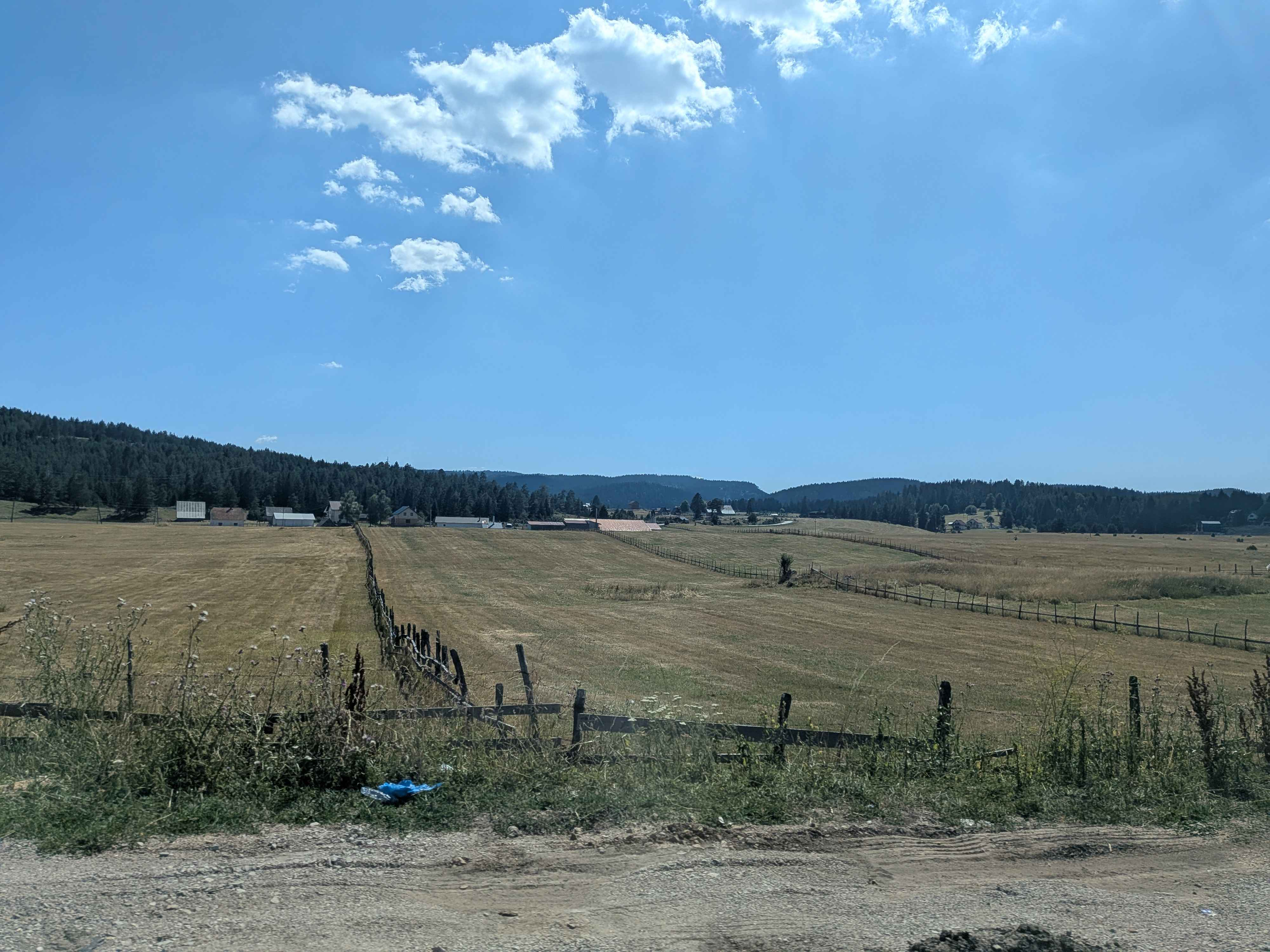
- Rural field, 2026

- Location within Bosnia and Herzegovina
- Coordinates: 43°54′34″N 18°40′20″E
- Country: Bosnia and Herzegovina
- Entity: Republika Srpska
- Municipality: Sokolac

Population (2013)
  - Total: 260
- Time zone: UTC+1 (CET)
  - Summer (DST): UTC+2 (CEST)

Ravna Romanija (Serbian Cyrillic: Равна Романија) is a village in the municipality of Sokolac, Republika Srpska, Bosnia and Herzegovina.

== Geography ==
The village, named "flat Romanija", is located within the Romanija geographical region.

== History ==
=== Bosnian War ===
In 1991, the area was incorporated into the SAO Romanija, a Serb-established autonomous province, which later merged with other SAOs to form Republika Srpska in 1992.

=== Present day ===
In 2013, then-mayor of Sokolac Milovan Bjelica planned to construct an ethno-village in Ravna Romanija via a Three Million KM loan.

On February 11, 2018, the flag of Republika Srpska was torn down in the area. Following the action, an investigation by the East Sarajevo Police Department was conducted. In August 2022, the names of over 4,000 Serb soldiers were written on the walls of the Sokolica Monastery.

== Religion and monastery ==
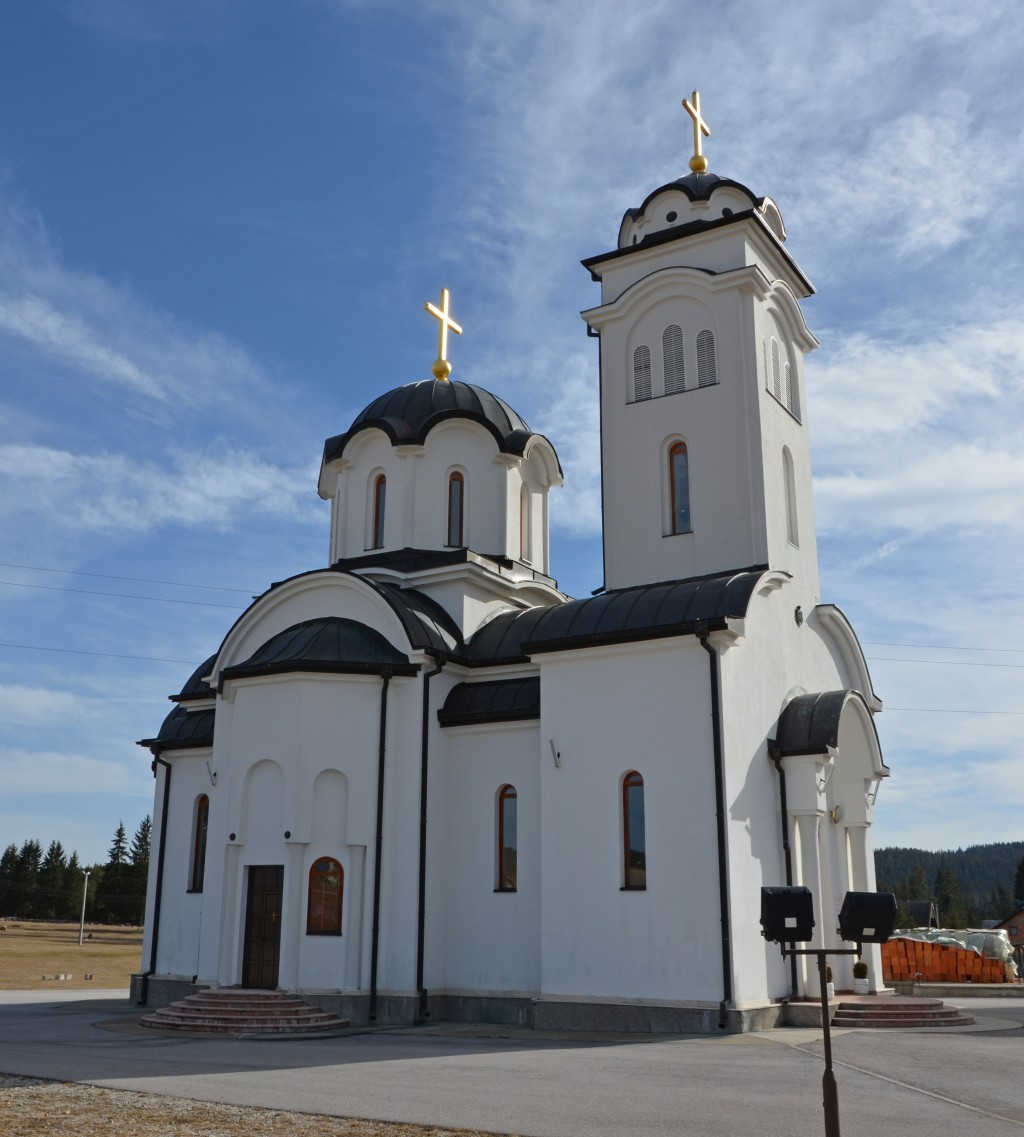
The medieval monastery of Sokolica, 2014

The medieval monastery of Sokolica, dedicated to Saint George, is located in the area. Ravna Romanija belongs to the parish in Mokro (of the Serbian Orthodox Church), which is headquartered in the "Church of the Dormition of the Virgin" in Mokro.

== Demographic history ==
According to the 1991 census, the village had 115 inhabitants, out of whom 111 were Serbs (96,52%), 3 Muslims (2,61%), and 1 Yugoslav (0,87%). In 2013, the population increased to 260, nearly all Orthodox Serbs.
