= Romanija =

Mountain and geographical region in eastern Bosnia and Herzegovina

- Романија
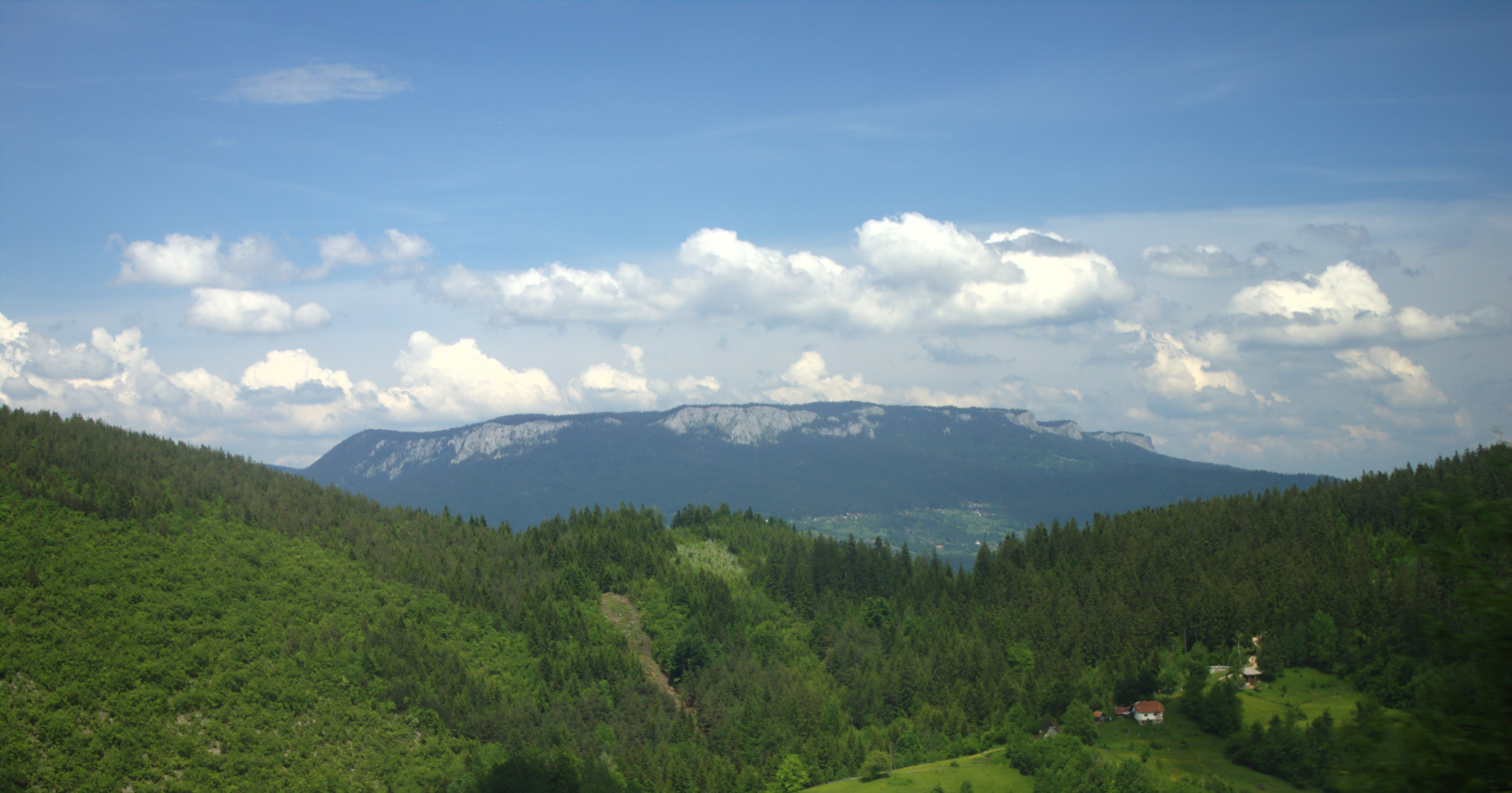
- Landscape in the Romanija mountain

Highest point
- Elevation: 1,652 m (5,420 ft)
- Coordinates: 43°51′36″N 18°40′12″E

Geography
- Location within Bosnia and Herzegovina
- Location: Bosnia and Herzegovina
- Parent range: Dinaric Alps

Romanija (Serbian Cyrillic: Романија) is a mountain, karst plateau, and geographical region in eastern Bosnia and Herzegovina, including numerous villages and towns, such as Pale, Sokolac, Rogatica and Han Pijesak. Its highest point is Veliki Lupoglav (1,652 m).

It is located about 20 km east of Sarajevo, between the neighboring mountains of Ozren to the north and Jahorina to the south.

A football club from the neighbouring town of Pale bears its name, FK Romanija.

== History ==
In 1991–1992 there was the so-called "Serb Autonomous Region of Romanija", also known as "Romanija–Birač", an autonomous region which became part of Republika Srpska during the 1992–1995 Bosnian War.

== See also ==
- Glasinac
- Ravna Romanija
- Podromanija
- SAO Romanija

== Bibliography ==
- Guber, Mihovil (1943). "Pustošenje planinarskih objekata u južnoj Hrvatskoj" [The Desolation of Mountain Objects in Southern Croatia] (PDF). Hrvatski planinar (in Croatian). Vol. 39, no. 6–7. pp. 85–93. ISSN 0354-0650.
