= SAO Romanija =

Short-lived Serb breakaway region in Yugoslavia

Serb Autonomous Oblast of Romanija Српска Аутономна Област Романија Srpska Autonomna Oblast Romanija
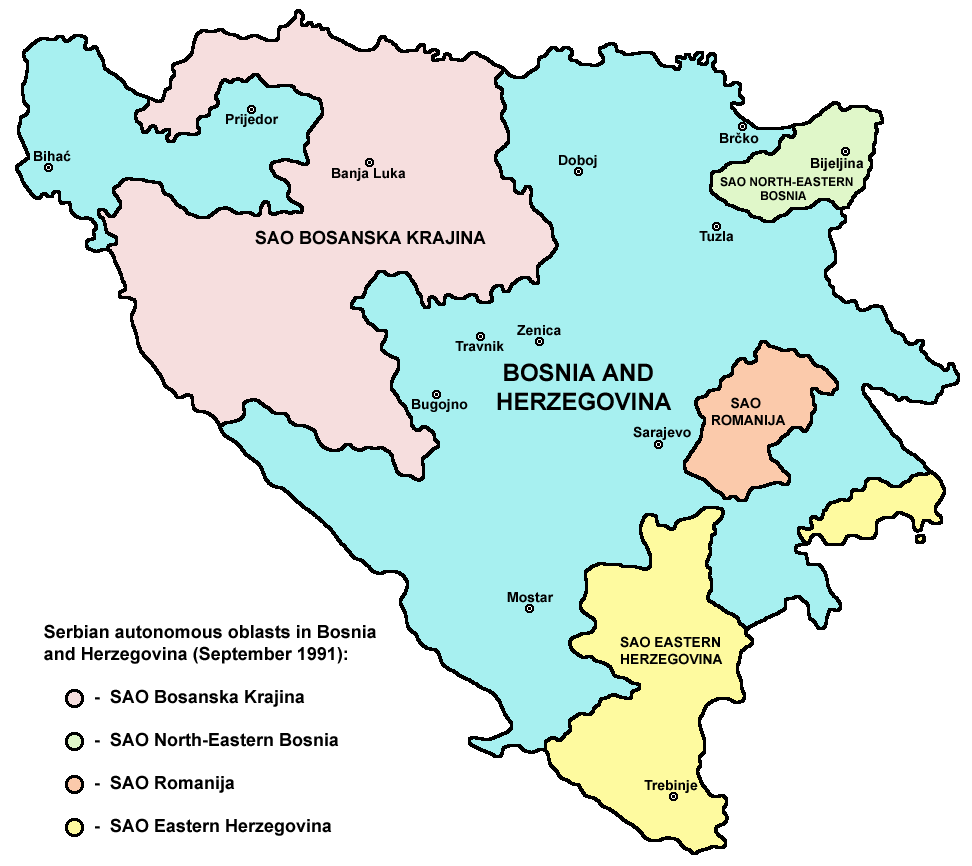
- Location of SAO Romanija (in red) within Bosnia and Herzegovina, 1991–1992.
- Status: Self-proclaimed Serb Autonomous Oblast
- Capital: Pale; 43°48′43″N 18°34′16″E
- Common languages: Serbo-Croatian
- Government: Provisional government
- Historical era: Breakup of Yugoslavia
  - Proclaimed: September 1991
  - Merged into SAO Romanija-Birač: November 1991
  - Incorporated into the Serbian Republic of BiH: 9 January 1992
Preceded by	Succeeded by
Socialist Republic of Bosnia and Herzegovina	Serbian Republic of Bosnia and Herzegovina
- Today part of: Bosnia and Herzegovina

The SAO of Romanija (Serbian Cyrillic: САО Романија, Serbian: SAO Romanija) was a self-proclaimed ethnic Serb autonomous region within SR Bosnia and Herzegovina in the prelude to the Bosnian War. It was named after the Romanija mountain. It included parts of three municipalities with a population of 37,000. It was formed as part of a coordinated political project by the Serb Democratic Party (SDS) to create a separate Serb polity.

The entity was centered in Pale, in the Romanija mountain region east of Sarajevo. In November 1991, it was reorganized and merged with SAO Birač to form the SAO Romanija-Birač. These SAO structures were subsequently incorporated into the "Serbian Republic of Bosnia and Herzegovina" (Srpska Republika Bosna i Hercegovina) when it was proclaimed on 9 January 1992. This entity was officially renamed Republika Srpska on 12 August 1992.

== Background and creation ==
In 1990 and 1991, following the victory of nationalist parties in the first multi-party elections, the Serb Democratic Party (SDS) began establishing parallel institutions and regional structures. This process was formalized with the creation of the "Assembly of the Serb People in Bosnia and Herzegovina" on 24 October 1991.

The SAOs were formed in areas with significant Serb populations as a means to create a territorial entity from which to challenge the Bosnian government's move toward independence. The SAO Romanija was proclaimed in September 1991.

This political project was further defined by the SDS document "Instructions for the Organization and Activity of Organs of the Serbian People in Bosnia and Herzegovina in Extraordinary Circumstances," issued on 19 December 1991. This document ordered SDS-controlled municipal bodies and "Crisis Staffs" to secretly prepare for the creation of a separate Serb state by securing resources, establishing parallel communications, and coordinating with the Yugoslav People's Army (JNA).

== Merger and reorganization ==
In November 1991, the SAO Romanija was reorganized and merged with the newly proclaimed SAO Birač (centered in Vlasenica) to form the SAO Romanija-Birač. This merged entity encompassed a strategic area of eastern Bosnia, from the Romanija–Jahorina–Trebević area near Sarajevo eastwards across the Drina valley. According to analysis from the CIA, the entity's leadership was based in Pale.

== Transition into Republika Srpska ==
On 9 January 1992, the "Assembly of the Serb People in Bosnia and Herzegovina" proclaimed the "Serbian Republic of Bosnia and Herzegovina" (Srpska Republika Bosna i Hercegovina). On 28 February 1992, this new entity adopted its constitution, which stated that its territory included the existing Serb Autonomous Oblasts, including SAO Romanija-Birač.

The regional administrative and security structures of the SAOs, including their Crisis Staffs and police forces, were gradually centralized and formally integrated into this new state. This process was accelerated after 12 May 1992, when the Serb Assembly voted to establish the Army of Republika Srpska (VRS) to succeed the JNA, which was officially withdrawing. On 12 August 1992, the entity's name was officially shortened to "Republika Srpska" (RS), and the SAO structures were formally dissolved.

== See also ==
- Romanija
- SAO Birač
- SAO Bosanska Krajina
- SAO North-Eastern Bosnia
- SAO Herzegovina
- Sarajevo-Romanija Corps
