= List of convicted war criminals =

This is a list of convicted war criminals found guilty of war crimes under the rules of warfare as defined by the World War II Nuremberg Trials (as well as by earlier agreements established by the Hague Conferences of 1899 and 1907, the Kellogg-Briand Pact of 1928, and the Geneva Conventions of 1929 and 1949).

== American Civil War (1861–1865) ==
- James Duncan, Confederate guard in Andersonville Prison
- Champ Ferguson (1821–1865), Confederate guerrilla leader sentenced to death for the murders of civilians, prisoners and wounded soldiers.
- Henry C. Magruder (1844–1865), Confederate guerrilla sentenced to death for the murders of eight civilians.
- Henry Wirz (1822–1865), Confederate administrator of Andersonville Prison

== World War I (1914–1918) ==
- Edith Cavell (1865-1915), abused the protection arising from medical status by helping POWs escape, sentenced to death
- Benno Crusius, sentenced to two years imprisonment for the murders of French prisoners of war at Saarburg
- Ahmed Djemal (1872-1922), Triumvir and Minister of the Navy of the Ottoman Empire, sentenced to death in absentia for his role in the Armenian genocide, assassinated as part of Operation Nemesis
- Karl Heynen, sentenced to ten month's imprisonment for beating and threatening to shoot prisoners of war
- Emil Müller, commander of Flavy-le-Martel prison camp, sentenced to six month's imprisonment for mistreatment of prisoners under command responsibility
- Robert Neumann, sentenced to six month's imprisonment for physically abusing prisoners of war
- Enver Pasha (1881–1922), Triumvir and Minister of War of the Ottoman Empire, sentenced to death in absentia for his role in the Armenian genocide, killed in action during the Basmachi Movement
- Mehmed Talat (1874-1921), Triumvir and Grand Vizier of the Ottoman Empire, sentenced to death in absentia for his role in the Armenian genocide, assassinated as part of Operation Nemesis

== World War II ==
=== European theatre ===
==== Albania ====
- Bahri Omari (1889–1945), Minister of Foreign Affairs, sentenced to death and executed by firing squad

==== Austria ====
- Ernst Kaltenbrunner (1903–1946), Chief of the SD, the Sicherheitspolizei and the Reich Security Main Office after Reinhard Heydrich's assassination. Highest-ranking SS official to stand trial at Nuremberg where he was found guilty and executed by hanging.
- Rudolf Creutz (1896-1980), member of the Nazi SS, ordered mass deportation, sentenced to 15 years in prison at the Nuremberg RuSHA trial, released in 1951.
- Alexander Löhr (1885–1947), Austrian and German Air Force (Luftwaffe) commander, executed for anti-partisan operations and the bombing of Belgrade.
- Franz Murer (1912–1994), SS officer, sentenced to 25 years in prison for multiple extrajudicial killings in Vilnius
- Artur Seyss-Inquart (1892–1946), government official, collaborator and High Commissioner of the Netherlands

==== Croatia ====
- Andrija Artuković (1899–1988), minister of Justice and Internal Affairs of the Ustaše regime, sentenced to death, but was not carried out because of his age and poor health. He died in custody.
- Miroslav Filipović (1915–1946), Ustaše official and administrator of the Jasenovac concentration camp
- Slavko Kvaternik (1878–1947), military commander and Minister of the Domobranstvo
- Ljubo Miloš (1919–1948), Ustaše official in the Independent State of Croatia (NDH)
- Antun Najžer, physician and member of the Ustaše movement. He was sentenced to execution by a firing squad.
- Ante Pavelić (1889–1959), leader of the Ustaše, sentenced to death in absentia for multiple war crimes.
- Dinko Šakić (1921–2008), a convicted Croatian war criminal and commander of the Jasenovac concentration camp.
- Tomislav Sertić (1902–1945), member of the Ustaše regime
- Vjekoslav Servatzy (1889–1945), Ustaše military officer
- Slavko Štancer (1872–1945), commander-in-chief and inspector-general of the Domobranstvo

==== Denmark ====
- Grethe Bartram (1924–2017), Nazi collaborator and informant, sentenced to death but commuted to life in prison and released in 1956
- Johan Georg Fritz Beck (born 1900), Gestapo investigator, sentenced to 12 years in prison, released after three
- Kai Henning Bothildsen Nielsen (1919–1947), SS leader in Denmark, sentenced to death and executed
- Frantz Erik Toft (1926–1946), Gestapo interpreter, sentenced to death and executed

==== France ====
- Fernand de Brinon (1885–1947), collaborator and member of the Vichy government
- René Caron (1896–1942), perpetrator of the Abbeville massacre, sentenced to death by a German court-martial and executed by firing squad
- Joseph Darnand (1897–1945), Vichy chief of police.
- Émile Molet (1905–1942), perpetrator of the Abbeville massacre, sentenced to death by a German court-martial and executed by firing squad
- Philippe Pétain (1856–1951), Marshal of France and head of the collaborationist Vichy France, sentenced to death first, then life imprisonment

==== Hungary ====
- László Baky (1898–1946), Interior Ministry official
- Laszlo Bardossy (1890–1946), Prime Minister
- Franz Anton Basch (1901–1946), German Nazi leader in Hungary
- László Endre (1895–1946), Minister of the Interior
- Béla Imrédy (1891–1946), Prime Minister
- Andor Jaross (1896–1946), Nazi collaborator, executed by firing squad
- Ferenc Szálasi (1897–1946), head of state
- Dome Sztojay (died 1946), prime minister

==== Italy ====
- Nicola Bellomo (1881–1945), Italian Army general, executed by firing squad
- Pietro Caruso (1899-1944), police chief of Rome
- Guido Buffarini Guidi (1895–1945), Minister of the Interior for the Italian Social Republic, found guilty of committing ethnic cleansing and executed by firing squad in 1945
- Giovanni Ravalli (1909–1998), soldier in the Royal Italian Army, initially received a life sentence but was pardoned after serving 13 years.
- Vincenzo Serrentino (1897–1947), judge of the Italian Extraordinary Court for Dalmatia

==== Nazi Germany ====
===== A–C =====
- Otto Abetz (1903–1958), ambassador to France, sentenced to 20 years
- Josef Altstötter (1892–1979), Reich Ministry of Justice official, sentenced to five years in prison but was released on parole after only two-and-a-half years
- Otto Ambros (1901–1990), chemist, created unethical weapons used at concentration camps, sentenced to eight years in prison at the Nuremberg IG Farben trial, released in 1951.
- Wilhelm von Ammon (1903–1992), administrator in the Reich Ministry of Justice, sentenced to 10 years in prison at the Nuremberg judges' trial, released in 1951.
- Erich von dem Bach-Zelewski (1899–1972), official and SS officer
- Hans Baier (1893–1969), economic administration for the SS, sentenced to 10 years in prison at the Nuremberg Pohl trial, released in 1951.
- Klaus Barbie (1913–1991), Gestapo officer
- Hermann Becker-Freyseng (1910–1961), consultant for aviation medicine, sentenced to 20 years in prison, taken into American custody until his death.
- Wilhelm Beiglböck (1905–1963), medical internist, sentenced to 15 years in prison in the Nuremberg doctors' trial.
- Gottlob Berger (1897–1975), SS official
- Werner Best (1903–1989), German Plenipotentiary of Denmark
- Hans Biebow (1902–1947), chief of the German Administration of the Łódź Ghetto
- Dorothea Binz (1920–1947), overseer at Ravensbrück concentration camp, sentenced to death at the Hamburg Ravensbrück trials
- Paul Blobel (1894–1951), Einsatzgruppe C official
- Hanns Bobermin (1903–1960), economic administrator for the SS, sentenced to 20 years in prison at the Nuremberg Pohl trial, released in 1951.
- Franz Böhme (1885–1947), general in Nazi-occupied Yugoslavia, indicted for war crimes at the Nuremberg Hostages Trial, committed suicide in prison.
- Johanna Bormann (1893–1945), guard at Bergen-Belsen concentration camp, sentenced to death at the Belsen trials
- Martin Bormann (1900–c. 1945), Nazi Party Chancellor, tried at Nuremberg in absentia
- Greta Bösel (1908–1947), assistant chief warden at Ravensbrück concentration camp, sentenced to death at the Hamburg Ravensbrück trials
- Herta Bothe (1921–2000), guard at Bergen-Belsen concentration camp, sentenced to 10 years' imprisonment at the Belsen trials
- Franz Böttger (1888–1946), SS-Oberscharführer, sentenced to death at the Dachau camp trial.
- Philipp Bouhler (1899–1945) Führer Chancellory official
- Viktor Brack (1904 –1948), Führer Chancellory official
- Otto Bradfisch (1903–1994), SS Obersturmbannführer, Leader of Einsatzkommando 8 of Einsatzgruppe B of the Security Police (Sicherheitspolizei) and the SD, and Commander of the Security Police in Litzmannstadt (Łódź) and Potsdam
- Karl Brandt (1904–1948), Plenipotentiary for Health official
- Rudolf Brandt (1909–1948), secretary of Heinrich Himmler
- Werner Braune (1909–1951), Einsatzgruppe D official
- Heinz Brückner (born 1913-† unknown), official on illegal extradition, sentenced to 15 years in prison at the Nuremberg RuSHA trial, released in 1951.
- Josef Bühler (1904–1948), German Generalgouvernement official
- Ernst Bürgin (1885–1966), industrialist, created unethical weapons in Nazi-occupied Norway, sentenced to two years in prison at the Nuremberg IG Farben trial.
- Odilo Burkart (1899–1979), industrialist, charged and indicted with using slave labor at the Nuremberg Flick trial, released in 1947.
- Heinrich Bütefisch (1894–1969), Chemist, member of the SS, sentenced to six years in prison at the Nuremberg IG Farben trial, released in 1951.
- Carl Clauberg (1898-1957), gynecologist who conducted human experiments at the Auschwitz concentration camp

===== D–G =====
- Kurt Daluege (1897–1946), ORPO and Protektorat official
- Theodor Dannecker (1913–1945), SS deportation expert in France and Bulgaria
- Ernst Dehner (1889–1970), general, sentenced to 7 years in prison at the Nuremberg Hostages trial, released in 1951.
- Dominyk Delta (1892–1966), personal bodyguard to Adolf Hitler and commander of Nazi security
- Otto Dietrich (1898–1957), personal Press Secretary to Adolf Hitler
- Oskar Dirlewanger (1895-1945), Oberführer
- Karl Dönitz (1891–1980), naval commander and Hitler's appointed successor
- Wilhelm Dörr (1921–1945), guard at Bergen-Belsen concentration camp, sentenced to death at the Belsen trials
- Anton Dostler (1891–1945), General
- Richard Drauz (1894–1946), Kreisleiter sentenced to death for murdering an American airman
- Walter Dürrfeld (1899–1967), industrialist at Monowitz concentration camp, sentenced to eight years in prison at the Nuremberg IG Farben trial.
- Herta Ehlert (1905–1997), guard at Bergen-Belsen concentration camp, sentenced to 15 years' imprisonment at the Belsen trials
- Adolf Eichmann (1906–1962), SS official
- August Eigruber (1907–1947), Gauleiter of Oberdonau (Upper Danube) and Landeshauptmann of Upper Austria
- Franz Eirenschmalz (born in 1901), economic administrator for the SS, sentenced to death at the Nuremberg Pohl trial, commuted and released in 1951.
- Franz von Epp (1882–1946), Bavarian politician
- Gottfried von Erdmannsdorff (1893–1946), general
- Heinz Fanslau (1909–1987), SS general, sentenced to 20 years in prison at the Nuremberg Pohl trial, released in 1954.
- Hellmuth Felmy (1885–1965), Nazi commander in Southern Greece, sentenced to 15 years in prison at the Nuremberg Hostages Trial, released in 1951.
- Fritz Fischer (1912–2003), doctor who committed experiments at Ravensbrück concentration camp, sentenced to life in prison at the Nuremberg doctor's trial, released in 1954.
- Friedrich Flick (1883–1972), industrialist, sentenced to 7 years in prison at the Nuremberg Flick trial.
- Otto Förschner (1902–1946), SS-Sturmbannführer, sentenced to death at the Dachau camp trial.
- Albert Forster (1902–1952), Gauleiter of the Free City of Danzig, sentenced to death and hanged.
- August Frank (1898–1984), SS administrator and economist, sentenced to life in prison at the Nuremberg Pohl trial, commuted to 15 years.
- Hans Frank (1900–1946), governor of Nazi-occupied Poland, sentenced to death and hanged.
- Wilhelm Frick (1877–1946), governor of Nazi-occupied Bohemia and Moravia, sentenced to death and hanged.
- Walther Funk (1890–1960), Reich minister for economic affairs, sentenced to life in prison, released in 1957.
- Karl Gebhardt (1897-1948), SS chief clinician
- Karl Genzken (1895–1957), SS medical officer
- Hans Globke (1898–1973), Ministerialdirigent in the Office for Jewish Affairs, sentenced to life imprisonment for war crimes in absentia by an East German court but avoided extradition due to his work for the government of West Germany.
- Richard Glücks (1889–1945), WVHA official
- Hermann Wilhelm Göring (1893–1946), Commander of the Luftwaffe
- Amon Göth (1908–1946), Commandant at the concentration camp at Płaszów, Poland
- Ulrich Greifelt (died 1949), Main Office official
- Arthur Greiser (died 1946), Gauleiter of Wartheland
- Irma Grese (1923–1945), administrator of the Auschwitz concentration camp
- Oskar Gröning, accessory to mass murder (by handling victims' confiscated possessions) in Auschwitz, sentenced to four years' imprisonment
- Karl Gropler (1923–2013), SS Unterscharführer, sentenced to life imprisonment for the Sant'Anna di Stazzema massacre

===== H–K =====
- Paul Häfliger (1886–1950), committed war crimes in Nazi-occupied Norway, sentenced to two years in prison at the Nuremberg IG Farben trial.
- Adolf Hamann (1885–1945), lieutenant-general.
- Siegfried Handloser (1885–1954), Chief of the Wehrmacht Medical Services, sentenced to life in prison, released in 1954.
- Fritz Hartjenstein (1905–1954), Auschwitz concentration camp administrator
- Irene Haschke, guard at Bergen-Belsen concentration camp, sentenced to 10 years' imprisonment at the Belsen trials
- Karl Haug (died 1947), Gestapo member, hanged
- Emil Haussmann (died 1948), major
- August Heissmeyer (1897–1979), SS officer
- Kurt Heissmeyer (1905–1967), SS doctor sentenced to life imprisonment for murdering children at Neuengamme concentration camp
- Martin Hellinger (1904–1988), dentist at Ravensbrück concentration camp, sentenced to 15 years imprisonment at the Hamburg Ravensbrück trials
- Konrad Henlein (1898–1945), Gauleiter of Sudetenland
- Eberhard Herf (1887–1946), Commander of the Order Police units in Minsk, Belarus, executed by hanging.
- Rudolf Hess (1894–1987), deputy Führer
- Friedrich Hildebrandt (1898–1948), Gauleiter of Gau Mecklenburg and SS-Obergruppenführer
- Richard Hildebrandt (1897–1951), RuSHA chief and Higher SS and Police Leader of Danzig
- Oskar von Hindenburg (1883–1960), commander of prisoner of war camps in East Prussia
- August Hirt (1898–1945), medical officer who ran the Struthof-Nazweiler laboratory
- Franz Hofer (1902–1975), Gauleiter of the Tyrol and Vorarlberg
- Hermann Höfle (1911–1962), Higher SS and Police Leader in Slovakia
- Otto Hofmann (1896–1982), RuSHA Chief and Higher SS and Police Leader in Southwest Germany; sentenced to 25 years in prison at the Nuremberg RuSHA trial, reduced to 15 years in 1951, released in 1954.
- Rudolf Hoess (1900–1947), Auschwitz concentration camp commander and deputy inspector of Nazi concentration camps
- Hans Hohberg, SS executive officer, sentenced to 10 years in prison at the Nuremberg Pohl trial, released in 1951.
- Franz Hössler (1906–1945), SS officer who served as a deputy camp commander at both Auschwitz and Bergen-Belsen concentration camps, executed by hanging in 1945.
- Hermann Hoth (1885–1971), commander of Panzer Group 3, Army Group Center, 17th Group Army and Army Group South
- Waldemar Hoven (1903–1948), Buchenwald concentration camp doctor.
- Herbert Hübner (1902–1951), SS leader, deported people from Poland, sentenced to 15 years in prison at the Nuremberg RuSHA trial, released in 1951.
- Otto Ilgenfritz, SS-Obersturmführer, sentenced to 15 years for killing a British soldier, released in 1954.
- Max Ilgner (1895–1957), IG Farben official
- Friedrich Jähne (1879–1965), engineer, sentenced to 18 months in prison at the Nuremberg IG Farben trial, released in 1948.
- August Jäger (1887–1949), Regierungspräsident in Posen, convicted and hanged in Poland.
- Friedrich Jeckeln (died 1946), SS officer and Police Leader of Ostland
- Alfred Jodl (1890–1946), commander of operations personnel
- Günther Joël (1903–1978), prosecutor, sentenced to five years in prison at the Nuremberg judges' trial, released in 1951.
- Heinz Jost (1904–1964), Einsatzgruppe commander
- Hans Jüttner (1894–1965), commander of the SS's Main Leadership Office and Obergruppenführer.
- Wilhelm Keitel (1882–1946), Field Marshal. Sentenced to death by hanging at Nuremberg.
- Albert Kesselring (1885–1960), Luftwaffe Generalfeldmarschall, sentenced to death for incitement to murder civilians and alleged involvement in the Ardeatine massacre, sentence commuted to life imprisonment.
- Max Kiefer (1889–1974), SS economic administrator, sentenced to life in prison at the Nuremberg Pohl trial, released in 1951.
- Josef Kieffe (1900-1947), Gestapo officer in Paris, convicted of war crimes, hanged.
- Dietrich Klagges (1891–1971), politician and premier (Ministerpräsident) of Braunschweig
- Fritz Klein (1888–1945), physician at Bergen-Belsen and Auschwitz-Birkenau concentration camps, sentenced to death at the Belsen trials
- Herbert Klemm (1903–1961), State Secretary in the Reich Ministry of Justice, sentenced to life in prison at the Nuremberg judges' trial, released in 1956.
- Fritz Knoechlein (1911–1949), SS Obersturmbannführer, convicted and executed for war crimes (Le Paradis massacre)
- Erwin Knop (1905–1946), commander of the Enschede SiPo
- Erich Koch (1896–1986), Reichskommissar for Ukraine and Reichskommissariat Ostland, served life in prison for war crimes in Poland
- Ilse Koch (1906–1967), female officer at Buchenwald and Sachsenhausen concentration camps
- Josef Kramer (1905–1945), commander of Auschwitz-Birkenau and Bergen-Belsen concentration camps, sentenced to death at the Belsen trials
- Carl Krauch (1887–1968), Chairman of the Supervisory Board, member of Göring's Office of the Four-Year Plan, sentenced to 6 years in prison at the Nuremberg IG Farben trial, released in 1950
- Alfried Krupp (1907–1967) Steel/Arms maker; involved in slave labour
- Hans Kugler (1900–1968), industrialist, took over French companies in occupied France, sentenced to 18 months in prison at the Nuremberg IG Farben trial, released in 1948.
- Walter Kuntze (1883–1960), general who served as the commander of the 12th Army, sentenced to life in prison but was released in 1953.
- Franz Kutschera (1904–1944), SS general and Gauleiter of Carinthia.

===== L–P =====
- Hubert Lanz (1896–1982), general, sentenced to 12 years in prison at the Nuremberg Hostages Trial, released in 1951.
- Ernst Lautz (1887–1979), Chief Public Prosecutor of the People's Court, sentenced to 10 years in prison at the Nuremberg judges' trial, released in 1951.
- Robert Ley (1890–1945), head of the labor force, indicted at the Nuremberg trials, committed suicide in custody.
- Ernst von Leyser (1889–1962), general, sentenced to 10 years in prison at the Nuremberg Hostages Trial, released in 1951.
- Wilhelm List (1880–1971), field marshal, sentenced to life in prison at the Nuremberg hostages' trial, released in 1952.
- Hinrich Lohse (1896–1964), politician
- Werner Lorenz (1891–1974), head of Volksdeutsche Mittelstelle (Repatriation Office for Ethnic Germans) and an SS Obergruppenführer.
- Georg Lörner (1899–1959), SS administrator and economist, sentenced to death, commuted and released in 1954.
- Hans Lörner (Born 1893), SS senior leader of the SS, sentenced to 10 years in prison at the Nuremberg Pohl trial, released in 1951.
- Eberhard von Mackensen (1889–1969), commander of the 14th army, convicted of involvement in the Ardeatine massacre.
- Kurt Mälzer (1894–1952), Luftwaffe general and military commander of Rome, convicted of ordering the Ardeatine massacre.
- Erich von Manstein (1887–1973), Generalfeldmarschall, convicted of using slave labour and murders of prisoners and civilians.
- Elisabeth Marschall (1886–1947), head nurse at Ravensbrück concentration camp, sentenced to death at the Hamburg Ravensbrück trials
- Fritz ter Meer (1884–1967), industrialist, planned the Monowitz concentration camp, sentenced to seven years in prison at the Nuremberg IG Farben trial, released in 1951.
- Wolfgang Mettgenberg (1882–1950), representative of the Reich ministry of justice, sentenced to 10 years in prison at the Nuremberg judges' trial, died in Landsberg Prison.
- Konrad Meyer (1901–1973), SS General, created the Generalplan Ost resulting in the deportation of over 30 million Slavic people, sentenced to time served at the Nuremberg RuSHA trial, released in 1948.
- Kurt Meyer (1910–1961), commander of 12th SS Panzer Division Hitlerjugend, convicted of war crimes for his role in the Ardenne Abbey massacre.
- August Meyszner (1886–1947), Higher SS and Police Leader in German-occupied Serbia.
- Erhard Milch (1892–1972), Luftwaffe officer.
- Elfriede Mohneke (1922–1994), assistant warden at Ravensbrück concentration camp, sentenced to 10 years imprisonment at the Hamburg Ravensbrück trials
- Otto Moll (1915–1946), SS-Hauptscharführer, sentenced to death at the Dachau camp trial.
- Joachim Mrugowsky (1905–1948), senior hygienist, sentenced to death in the Nuremberg doctor's trial, executed in 1948.
- Friedrich-Wilhelm Müller (1897–1947), executed for atrocities committed during the occupation of Crete.
- Karl Mummenthey (born 1906), SS economic administrator, sentenced to life in prison, released in 1953.
- Erich Naumann (died 1951), Einsatzgruppe B commander
- Günther Nebelung (1896–1970), Chief Justice of the People's Court, interned by the Allies in 1945, indicted in the Nuremberg judges' trial, released in 1947.
- Hermann Neubacher (died 1960), supported mayor of Vienna and Southeast Economic Plenipotentiary
- Ruth Neudeck (1920–1948), overseer at Ravensbrück concentration camp, sentenced to death at the Hamburg Ravensbrück trials
- Konstantin von Neurath (1873–1956), Foreign Minister and Reichsprotektor
- Engelbert Valentin Niedermeyer, SS-Unterscharführer, sentenced to death at the Dachau camp trial.
- Herta Oberheuser (1911–1978), doctor at the Ravensbrück concentration camp, sentenced to 20 years in prison at the doctors' trial, released in 1952.
- Rudolf Oeschey (1903–1980), Chief judge of the Special Court at Nuremberg, sentenced to life in prison at the Nuremberg judges' trial, released in 1956
- Friedrich Opitz (1898–1948), "work leader" at Ravensbrück concentration camp, sentenced to death at the Hamburg Ravensbrück trials
- Heinrich Oster (1878–1954), industrialist, sentenced to 2 years in prison at the Nuremberg IG Farben trial, released in 1949.
- Friedrich Panzinger (1903–1959), RSHA official
- Franz von Papen (1879–1969), diplomat and deputy chancellor
- Joachim Peiper (1915–1976), SS-Standartenführer, 1st SS Panzer Division, Leibstandarte-SS Adolf Hitler, held responsible for the Malmedy massacre during the Malmedy massacre trial
- Hans Petersen (1885–1963), Chief Justice of the People's Court, charged and indicted in the Nuremberg judges' trial, released in 1947.
- Hans Pflaum (1910–1950), "work leader" at Ravensbrück concentration camp, sentenced to death by a French military court
- Alexander Piorkowski (1904–1948), commander of Dachau concentration camp, sentenced to death at the Dachau trials.
- Paul Pleiger (1899–1985), General Director and Supervisory Board Chairman of the Reichswerke Hermann Göring, Reich Commissioner for Coal Supply, War Economy Leader, sentenced to 15 years in Ministries trial, released in 1951.
- Oswald Pohl (died 1951), WVHA official
- Hermann Pook (1901–1983), SS dentist, sentenced to 10 years in prison at the Nuremberg Pohl trial, released in 1951.
- Helmut Poppendick (1902–1994), chief of personal staff, sentenced to 10 years in prison at the doctors' trial, released in 1951.
- Erich Priebke (1913–2013), Hauptsturmführer, convicted for participation in the Ardeatine massacre, sentenced to 15 years in prison, later life, moved to house arrest

===== R–S =====
- Margarete Rabe (born 1923), warden at Ravensbrück concentration camp, sentenced to life imprisonment at the Hamburg Ravensbrück trials
- Erich Raeder (1876–1960), grand admiral, sentenced to life imprisonment, later released
- Friedrich Rainer (1903–1947?), Gauleiter and Landeshauptmann of Salzburg and Carinthia, sentenced to death
- Hanns Albin Rauter (died 1949), Higher SS and Police Leader in the Netherlands, sentenced to death
- Hermann Reinecke (1888–1973), OKW official, sentenced to life imprisonment, later released
- Lothar Rendulic (1887–1971), commander of the 52nd Infantry Division, sentenced to 20 years (later 10)
- Joachim von Ribbentrop (1893–1946), foreign minister, sentenced to death
- Hermann Röhn (1902–1946), Deputy Gauleiter in Gau Baden, enforced Germanization and conscription in Alsace, convicted and executed by France
- Karl von Roques (died 1949), Rear Area Army Group South commander
- Gerhard Rose (1896–1992), expert on tropical disease, performed experiments in Dachau and Buchenwald concentration camp, sentenced to life in prison at the doctors' trial, released in 1955.
- Alfred Rosenberg (1893–1946), east minister, sentenced to death
- Oswald Rothaug (1897–1967), Chief Justice of the special court, sentenced to life in prison at the Nuremberg judges' Trial, released in 1956
- Curt Rothenberger (1896–1959), State Secretary in the Reich Ministry of Justice, sentenced to 7 years in prison at the Nuremberg judges' Trial, released in 1950
- Friedrich Wilhelm Ruppert (1905–1946), SS-Obersturmbannführer, sentenced to death at the Dachau camp trial.
- Vera Salvequart (1919–1947), kapo at Ravensbrück concentration camp, sentenced to death at the Hamburg Ravensbrück trials
- Fritz Sauckel (1894–1946), Labour Plenipotentiary official
- Gustav Adolf Scheel (1907–1979), physician and Nazi deportation officer
- Rudolf Scheide (born 1908), SS economic administrator, charged and indicted in the Nuremberg Pohl trial, released in 1947.
- Walter Schellenberg (died 1952), German RSHA official
- Claus Schilling (1871–1946), doctor at Dachau concentration camp, sentenced to death at the Dachau camp trial.
- Baldur von Schirach (1907–1974), Vienna Reichsstatthalter
- Franz Schlegelberger (1876–1970), State Secretary in the Reich Ministry of Justice and later Justice Minister
- Vinzenz Schöttl (1905–1946), SS-Obersturmführer, sentenced to death at the Dachau camp trial.
- Hermann Schmitz (1881–1960), sentenced to four years in prison at the Nuremberg IG Farben trial, released in 1950.
- Georg von Schnitzler (1884–1962), sentenced to five years in prison at the Nuremberg IG Farben trial, released in 1949.
- Richard Schnur (died 1947), SS-Hauptsturmführer, sentenced to death for a massacre.
- Ida Schreiter (1912–1948), warden at Ravensbrück concentration camp, sentenced to death at the Hamburg Ravensbrück trials
- Oskar Schröder (died 1958), Chief of Staff of the Inspectorate of the Medical Service, sentenced to life in prison at the Nuremberg Doctors' trial, released in 1954.
- Josef Schuetz (1921–2023), Waffen-SS prison camp guard. Convicted June 2022 as the oldest person tried for war crimes from Nazi Germany.
- Erwin Schulz (1900–1981), SS general
- Heinrich Schwarz (1906–1947), administrator of the Auschwitz III Monowitz concentration camp.
- Johann Schwarzhuber (1904–1947), deputy commandant of Ravensbrück concentration camp, sentenced to death at the Hamburg Ravensbrück trials
- Karl Eberhard Schöngarth (1903–1946), SS officer
- Otto Schwarzenberger (born in 1900), Chief of war, sentenced to time served in the Nuremberg RuSHA trial, released in 1947.
- Siegfried Seidl (1911–1947), administrator of the Theresienstadt concentration camp
- Wolfram Sievers (1905–1948), Ahnenerbe official
- Karl Sommer (born in 1915), SS economic administrator, sentenced to death at the Nuremberg Pohl trial, commuted and released in 1953.
- Walter Sonntag (1907–1948), physician at Ravensbrück concentration camp, sentenced to death at the Hamburg Ravensbrück trials
- Albert Speer (1905–1981), armament and munitions minister.
- Wilhelm Speidel (1895–1970), general, sentenced to 20 years in prison at the Nuremberg Hostages Trial, released in 1951.
- Franz Stangl (1908–1971), SS officer and administrator of the Sobibór and Treblinka concentration camps.
- Otto Steinbrinck (1888–1949), industrialist and SS member
- Franz Strasser (1899–1945), Kreisleiter sentenced to death for participating in the murders of American airmen
- Julius Streicher (1885–1946), journalist and editor of the Der Stürmer
- Jürgen Stroop (1895-1952), SS and Police leader in Warsaw, convicted of murdering 9 US POWs. Hanged at Mokotow Prison in 1952.
- Wilhelm Stuckart (1902-1953), Interior Ministry official. Supported forced sterilization. Sentenced to time served. Released April 1949.
- Kurt Student (1890–1978), leader of Fallschirmjäger, convicted of mistreatment and murder of prisoners of war.
- Otto von Stulpnagel (1878-1948), military commander of Nazi-occupied France, charged with war crimes by French authorities. Committed suicide in Cherche-Midi Prison
- Fritz Suhren (1908–1950), commandant of Ravensbrück concentration camp, sentenced to death by a French military court

===== T–Z =====
- Bruno Tesch (1890–1946), chemist and owner of Tesch & Stabenow pest control company, convicted of supplying Zyklon B for use in mass exterminations
- Erwin Tschentscher (1903–1972), SS economic administrator, sentenced to 10 years in prison at the Nuremberg Pohl trial, released in 1951.
- Harald Turner (1891–1947), SS commander and Staatsrat (privy councillor) in the German military administration of the Territory of the Military Commander in Serbia
- Josef Vogt (1884–1967), SS economic and administrative official, indicted in the Nuremberg Pohl trial, released in 1947.
- Leo Volk (1909–1973), head of the SS legal department, sentenced to 10 years in prison at the Nuremberg Pohl trial, released in 1951.
- Elisabeth Volkenrath (1919–1945), guard at Ravensbrück, Auschwitz-Birkenau and Bergen-Belsen concentration camps, sentenced to death at the Belsen trials
- Otto Wagener (1888–1971), Military Governor of the Italian Dodecanese, sentenced to 15 years for execution of prisoners of war and hostages on Rhodes
- Robert Wagner (1895–1946), Chief of Civil Administration in Alsace and Reichsstatthalter of Baden
- Walter Warlimont (1894–1976), OKW official
- Helmuth Weidling (1891–1955), lieutenant-general, sentenced to 25 years' imprisonment for war crimes in the Soviet Union.
- Karl Weinbacher (1898–1946), deputy executive of Tesch & Stabenow, convicted of supplying Zyklon B for use in mass exterminations
- Bernhard Weiss (1904-1973), industrialist, sentenced to 2½ years in prison at the Nuremberg Flick trial. Served one year. Nephew of Friedrich Flick.
- Martin Weiss (1905–1946), commandant of Dachau concentration camp, sentenced to death at the Dachau camp trial.
- Carl Westphal (1902–1946), administrator for the Reich ministry of Justice, committed suicide after being charged and indicted in the Nuremberg judges' trial.
- Dieter Wisliceny (1911-1948), SS deportation expert in Greece, Slovakia and Hungary
- Karl Wolff (1900–1984), Heinrich Himmler's Chief of Staff
- Emma Zimmer (1888–1948), overseer at Ravensbrück and Auschwitz-Birkenau concentration camps, sentenced to death at the Hamburg Ravensbrück trials

==== Norway ====
- Richard Bruns (1900–1947), SS Untersturmführer, sentenced to execution at Akershus Fortress
- Siegfried Fehmer (1911–1948), SS-Hauptsturmführer, sentenced to execution at Akershus Fortress
- Gerhard Flesch (1909–1948), SS-Obersturmbannführer, sentenced to execution at Kristiansten Fortress
- Albert Viljam Hagelin (1881–1946), Minister of Domestic Affairs of Nazi-occupied Norway, sentenced to execution at Akershus Fortress
- Nils Peter Bernhard Hjelmberg (1923–1946), Gestapo translator and officer, sentenced to execution at Sverresborg
- Julius Nielson (1898–1948), commander of the SD at Trondheim, sentenced to execution at Kristiansten Fortress
- Willie August Kesting (died 1946), Sturmscharführer, sentenced to execution at Sverresborg
- Karl-Hans Hermann Klinge (1909–1946), criminal investigator for the Sicherheitspolizei, sentenced to execution at Akershus Fortress
- Emil Hugo Friedrich Koeber (1907–1947), member of the Sicherheitspolizei, sentenced to execution at Kristiansten Fortress
- Vidkun Quisling (1887–1945), Minister President of Nazi-occupied Norway, sentenced to execution at Akershus Fortress
- Ludwig Runzheimer (1912–1946), former commandant of the Espeland detention camp, sentenced to execution at Sverresborg
- Rudolf Theodor Adolf Schubert (1908–1947), member of the Sicherheitspolizei, sentenced to execution at Akershus Fortress
- August Stuckmann (1910–1947), member of the Sicherheitspolizei, sentenced to execution at Akershus Fortress
- Otto Wilhelm Albert Suhr (1902–1948), member and interpreter for the Sicherheitspolizei, sentenced to execution at Akershus Fortress

==== Romania ====
- Ion Antonescu (1882–1946), Prime Minister of Romania, found guilty of multiple war crimes by the Romanian People's Tribunals and executed by firing squad
- Mihai Antonescu (1907–1946), government official; found guilty by the Romanian People's Tribunals and executed
- Constantin Petrovicescu (1883–1949), soldier and member of the Iron Guard, sentenced to life in prison.

==== Slovakia ====
- Jozef Tiso (1887–1947), President of the First Slovak Republic, sentenced to death and hanged for his role in the Holocaust in Slovakia.
- Vojtech Tuka (1880–1946), Prime Minister of the First Slovak Republic from 1939 to 1945, found guilty for mass deportation of Slovak Jews and executed by hanging in 1946.

==== Soviet Union ====
- John Demjanjuk (1920-2012), camp guard at Sobibor extermination camp
- Feodor Fedorenko (1907–1987), Ukrainian-Soviet guard at Treblinka extermination camp, sentenced to death for war crimes.
- Antonina Makarova (1920–1979), Soviet collaborator sentenced to death for murdering 168 prisoners of war.
- Vasyl Meleshko (1917–1975), Ukrainian-Soviet collaborator sentenced to death for his role in the Khatyn massacre.
- Ivan Rechkalov (1911–1943), Soviet gas van operator.
- Hryhoriy Vasiura (1915–1987), Ukrainian-Soviet collaborator sentenced to death for his role in the Khatyn massacre.

==== United States ====
- Fred A. McMurray (died 1945), American G.I. executed for a murder and two rapes committed during the Italian Campaign, guilt has been called into question, on account of his race.
- Louis Till (1922–1945), American G.I. executed for a murder and two rapes committed during the Italian Campaign, guilt has been called into question, on account of his race.
- Horace T. West (died 1974), American soldier convicted of premeditated murder committed at Biscari.

==== Yugoslavia ====
- Momčilo Đujić (1907–1999), Serbian commander of the Chetniks, sentenced to death in absentia for multiple war crimes.
- Draža Mihailović (1893–1946), founder of the Chetniks sentenced to death for genocidal actions taken against Jewish, Muslim and Croat civilians. Conviction posthumously overturned in 2015.

==== Other ====
- Sekula Drljević (1884–1945), Montenegrin Nazi collaborator
- Ričards Jasevs (1902-1991), Latvian Nazi collaborator
- Carmen Mory (1906–1947), Swiss kapo at Ravensbrück concentration camp, convicted and sentenced to death.
- Anthony Sawoniuk (1921–2005), Belarusian collaborator
- Cyriel Verschaeve (1874–1949), Flemish priest and Nazi collaborator, sentenced to death in absentia.

=== Pacific theatre ===
==== Japan ====
- Kōsō Abe (1892-1947), admiral convicted and executed for war crimes he committed during the Battle of Kwajalein Atoll
- Kenji Doihara (1883–1948), general
- Shimpei Fukuye, commander general sentenced to death for his role in the Selarang Barracks incident
- Shunroku Hata (1879–1962), former Minister of War
- Kōki Hirota (1878–1948), Prime Minister from 1936 to 1937
- Masaharu Homma (1887–1946), general involved in the Bataan Death March
- Rensuke Isogai (1886–1967), third governor of Japanese-occupied Hong Kong, sentenced to life imprisonment
- Seishirō Itagaki (1885–1948), War Minister
- Michiaki Kamada (1880–1947), naval officer responsible for the deaths of 1,500 Borneo natives
- Saburo Kawamura, executed for involvement in the Sook Ching massacres
- Heitarō Kimura (1888–1948), General; hanged
- Kuniaki Koiso (1880–1950), prime minister, sentenced to life imprisonment
- Iwane Matsui (1878–1948), general in the Imperial Japanese Army, sentenced to death and hanged for his involvement in the Rape of Nanking.
- Toshiaki Mukai (1912–1948), soldier, sentenced to death for participating in the hundred man killing contest.
- Akira Mutō (1883–1948), army commander and member of the General High Staff, sentenced to death
- Hiromi Nakayama (died 1946), army soldier hanged for war crimes
- Takuma Nishimura (1889–1951), military officer who was found guilty of perpetrating the Parit Sulong Massacre, executed by hanging in 1951.
- Tsuyoshi Noda (1912–1948), soldier, sentenced to death for participating in the hundred man killing contest.
- Masayuki Oishi, executed for involvement in the Sook Ching massacres
- Tasuku Okada (1890–1949), lieutenant general, convicted of killing prisoners of war and executed.
- Hiroshi Ōshima (1886–1975), ambassador to Germany
- Takashi Sakai (1887–1946), governor of occupied Hong Kong, sentenced to death
- Shigematsu Sakaibara (1898–1947), admiral in the Imperial Japanese Navy, convicted of killing prisoners of war and executed.
- Mamoru Shigemitsu (1887–1957), foreign minister
- Teiichi Suzuki (1888–1989), Lieutenant General who planned Japan's economy, pardoned in 1958
- Toshio Shiratori (1887-1949), ambassador to Italy
- Sato Shunji (1896–1977), chief of 5th Army medical service, sentenced to 20 year's imprisonment at the Khabarovsk war crimes trials
- Yoshio Tachibana (1890-1947), Lieutenant General convicted for his involvement in the Chichijima incident, executed by the United States
- Gunkichi Tanaka, soldier, sentenced to death for killing over 300 prisoners during the Rape of Nanking
- Hisakazu Tanaka (1889–1947), commander of the 23rd Army and final governor of occupied Hong Kong, sentenced to death
- Hisao Tani (1882–1947), lieutenant general in the Imperial Japanese Army, convicted as the ringleader of the Rape of Nanking and executed
- Hideki Tōjō (1884–1948), prime minister and general in the Imperial Japanese Army, sentenced to death and hanged.
- Yoshijirō Umezu (1882–1949), successor to Hideki Tojo as Chief of the Imperial Japanese Army General Staff Office, found guilty of waging a war of aggression and sentenced to life in prison in 1948
- Otozō Yamada (1881–1965), Commander-in-Chief of the Kwantung Army, sentenced to 25 years' imprisonment at the Khabarovsk war crimes trials
- Tomoyuki Yamashita (1885–1946), general; his conviction resulted in establishing a new doctrine regarding criminal culpability for the involvement of chain of command in war crimes: Yamashita standard.

==== Other ====
- Lee Hak-rae, Korean soldier who fought for the Japanese
- Kanao Inouye (1916–1947), Japanese-Canadian traitor convicted of torturing Allied prisoners of war.
- Hong Sa-ik (1889–1946), Korean lieutenant-general in the Imperial Japanese Army, sentenced to death for atrocities against prisoners
- Zhang Jinghui (1871–1959), Prime Minister of Manchukuo from 1935 to 1945

== Guatemalan Civil War ==
- Felipe Cusanero, military officer convicted of war crimes, torture, and forced disappearances.
- Candido Noriega, farmer with far-right paramilitary connections who aided in the capture and murder of left-wing civilians.
- Otto Pérez Molina (born 1950), Director of Military Intelligence who was involved in scorched earth campaigns, torture, and the murder of POWs and civilians.
- Efraín Ríos Montt (1926–2018), President of Guatemala from 1982 to 1983, sentenced to 80 years in prison for war crimes and acts of genocide.

== Bangladesh Liberation War ==
- Ghulam Azam (1922–2014), former leader of Bangladesh Jamaat-e-Islami sentenced to 90 years' imprisonment
- Salahuddin Quader Chowdhury (1949-2015), former member of the Jatiya Sangsad, sentenced to death for multiple war crimes and hanged
- Ashrafuz Zaman Khan (born 1948), sentenced to death by hanging for the murder of 18 people described as prominent intellectuals
- Abdul Quader Molla (1948–2013), Sentenced to death for mass murder
- Chowdhury Mueen-Uddin (born 1948), sentenced to death by hanging for the murder of 18 people described as prominent intellectuals
- Motiur Rahman Nizami (1943–2016), leader of Al Badr, sentenced to death and hanged for his role in masterminding the Demra massacre.
- Khalilur Rahman (born 1955), commander in Al Badr, convicted of killing, torturing, abduction, looting, rape, and arson in 2015. He was sentenced to death and arrested in 2022. He currently sits on death row
- Delwar Hossain Sayeedi (1940-2023), member of the Jatiya Sangsad, sentenced to life in prison
- Abdus Sobhan (1936–2020), former MP convicted of crimes against humanity

== Dirty War ==
- Adolfo Scilingo (born 1946), Argentine naval officer, sentenced to life in prison for multiple acts of torture and extrajudicial killings.
- Alfredo Astiz (born 1951), Argentine commando convicted of kidnapping and torture.
- Jorge Rafael Videla (1925–2013), President of Argentina from 1976 to 1981, found guilty of multiple war crimes and crimes against humanity and sentenced to life in prison.

== Khmer Rouge regime ==
- Nuon Chea (1926-2019), second-in-command of the Khmer Rouge, sentenced to life in prison for his role in the Cambodian genocide
- Kang Kek Iew (1942-2020), oversaw Tuol Sleng where thousands were murdered and tortured. Sentenced to 30 years' imprisonment and then to life by the Cambodia Tribunal
- Khieu Samphan (born 1931), Khmer Rouge official who served as Chairman of the State Presidium of Democratic Kampuchea, sentenced to life in prison for his role in the Cambodian genocide

== Liberian Civil Wars ==
- Guus Kouwenhoven (born 1942), convicted of illegal arms trafficking related to war crimes in Liberia
- Charles McArther Emmanuel (born 1978), Anti-Terrorist Unit commander found guilty of torturing and murdering detainees.
- Charles Taylor (born 1948), 22nd President of Liberia, guilty on 11 counts of war crimes and crimes against humanity during both the Sierra Leone Civil War and the Second Liberian Civil War.

== Rwandan Civil War ==
- Jean-Paul Akayesu (born 1953), mayor of Taba commune, sentenced to life in prison for aiding and abetting in the Rwandan genocide.
- Théoneste Bagosora (1941–2021), Rwandan Armed Forces officer sentenced to life in prison for his role in planning and carrying out the Rwandan genocide, later reduced to 35 years on appeal.
- Jean-Bosco Barayagwiza (1950–2010), involved in the Hutu Power
- Augustin Bizimungu (born 1952), Chief of Staff of the Rwandan Army, sentenced to 30 years in prison for his role in the Rwandan genocide.
- Alphonse Higaniro (born 1949), factory owner, sentenced to 20 years.
- Jean Kambanda (born 1955), Prime Minister in the caretaker government during the Rwandan genocide, sentenced to life in prison for his role in planning and carrying out the genocide.
- Maria Kisito (born 1964), sentenced to 12 years in prison for supplying gasoline to a militia to burn refugees with.
- Gertrude Mukangango, sentenced to 15 years for handing over Tutsi refugees to the militia during the Rwandan genocide.
- Désiré Munyaneza (born 1966), businessman, sentenced to life in prison for committing multiple acts of war rape during the Rwandan genocide.
- Ferdinand Nahimana (born 1950), historian who incited the Rwandan genocide
- Elie Ndayamabaje, mayor of Muganza during the Rwandan Genocide
- Hassan Ngeze (born 1957), journalist and politician, sentenced to life in prison for his role in the Rwandan genocide, later reduced to 35 years on appeal.
- Ildéphonse Nizeyimana (born 1963), soldier convicted of having participated in the Rwandan genocide.
- Sylvan Nsabimana, charged with crimes against humanity in the Rwandan genocide
- Arsène Shalom Ntahobali, charged with crimes against humanity in the Rwandan genocide
- Dominique Ntawukulilyayo, sub-prefect of Gisaraga convicted of genocide
- Vincent Ntezimana, university professor, sentenced to 12 years.
- Alphonse Nteziryayo, prefect of Butare during the Rwandan Genocide
- Bernard Ntuyahaga (born 1952), Rwandan Army officer, sentenced to 20 years in prison for his role in the murder of ten Belgian United Nations peacekeepers at the beginning of the Rwandan genocide.
- Pauline Nyiramasuhuko (born 1946), politician indicted on charges of conspiracy to commit genocide.
- Tharcisse Renzaho (born 1944), soldier and head of the Civil Defence Committee for Kigali, sentenced to life in prison for his role in the Rwandan genocide.
- Georges Rutaganda (1958–2010), commander for the Interahamwe militia, sentenced to life in prison for his role in the Rwandan genocide.
- Innocent Sagahutu (born 1962), soldier in the Rwandan Armed Forces who helped carry out the Rwandan genocide, sentenced to 20 years in prison, later reduced to 15 years via appeal.
- Athanase Seromba (born 1963), Catholic priest, sentenced to life in prison for aiding and abetting in the Rwandan genocide.
- François Bazaramba (1951-2026) Pastor, Sentenced to life in prison by finland court
- Froduald Karamira (1947-1998) Second Vice President of the Republican Democratic Movement, Sentenced to death by rwanda court and executed by firing squad in 1998
- Désiré Munyaneza (Born 1966) Sentenced to Life imprisonment without the possibility of parole for 25 years by canada court

== Sierra Leone Civil War ==
- Augustine Gbao (born 1948), paramilitary commander for the Revolutionary United Front, sentenced to 25 years in prison.
- Brima Bazzy Kamara (born 1968), commander in the Armed Forces Revolutionary Council, sentenced to 45 years in prison.
- Santigie Borbor Kanu (born 1965), senior commander of the Armed Forces Revolutionary Council, sentenced to 51 years in prison.
- Issa Sesay (born 1970), senior officer of the RUF, sentenced to 52 years in prison.
- Charles Taylor (born 1948), 22nd President of Liberia, guilty on 11 counts of war crimes and crimes against humanity during both the Sierra Leone Civil War and the Second Liberian Civil War.

== Yugoslav Wars ==
After the Yugoslav Wars, an international Court was formed to try war criminals (ICTY). However, ICTY tried only a selected number of high-ranking people (a total of 161), with local Courts (in Bosnia and Herzegovina, Croatia and Serbia) starting trials mostly against individuals or soldiers who carried out orders of those high-ranking officers. Many of those have been convicted.

Croatia raised charges against 3,666 people for war crimes, of which 1,381 were dropped due to lack of evidence.

=== Bosnian War ===
==== A–K ====
- Fikret Abdić, Bosniak warlord, sentenced to six years for participating in the detention and killing of civilians
- Srećko Aćimović, former Bosnian Serb Army battalion commander aided genocide against Bosnians
- Đuro Adamović, Bosnian Serb soldier, sentenced to three years in prison for committing crimes against civilians, later acquitted during appeal
- Zoran Babic, Bosnian Serb policeman who persecuted Bosniaks
- Predrag Bastah, Bosnian Serb policeman convicted of killing 37 Bosniak civilians in the Yugoslav Wars
- Bratislav Bilbija, Bosnian Serb soldier, sentenced to two years in prison for committing crimes against civilians, later acquitted during appeal
- Tihomir Blaškić (born 1960), Bosnian Croat sentenced to 45 years, changed to nine years following appeal
- Boris Bosnjak, Bosnian Serb detention camp guard who mistreated and abused Bosniak and Croat civilian detainees
- Miroslav Bralo (born 1967), Bosnian Croat member of the "Jokers" anti-terrorist platoon, sentenced to 20 years
- Radoslav Brđanin (1948–2022), Bosnian Serb sentenced to 32 years (30 following appeal)
- Enver Buza, former commander of a Bosnian Army battalion convicted of killing 27 Croat civilians in Uzdol
- Miloš Čajević, Bosnian Serb police officer, sentenced to 13 years for intimidating and inhumane treatment
- Ibrahim Ceco, Bosnian Army Soldier, sentenced to a year and a half in prison for committing crimes against a civilian population
- Ranko Češić (born 1964), Bosnian Serb sentenced to 18 years for crimes in Brcko
- Fadil Čović, convicted of illegally detaining Serb and Croat civilians at Silos camp
- Halid Čović, convicted of illegally detaining Serb and Croat civilians at Silos camp
- Hazim Delić (born 1964), Bosniak sentenced to 18 years for crimes at Čelebići prison camp
- Ilija Đajić, Bosnian Serb detention camp guard who mistreated and abused Bosniak and Croat civilian detainees
- Dragana Đekić, Serbian member of the White Eagles, sentenced to 5 years in 2023 for participation in the Štrpci massacre
- Mustafa Đelilović, convicted of illegally detaining Serb and Croat civilians at Silos camp
- Damir Došen (born 1967), Bosnian Serb, sentenced to 5 years for Keraterm camp
- Senad Džananović, Bosniak soldier sentenced to 11 years for crimes against Serbians in Alipašino polje
- Dražen Erdemović (born 1972), Bosnian Croat who fought for Serb forces and was sentenced to five years for Pileca farm (part of Srebrenica massacre)
- Edin Gadžo, Bosniak soldier sentenced to five years for crimes against Serbians in Alipašino polje
- Stanislav Galić, Bosnian Serb commander in the Siege of Sarajevo. Sentenced to 20 years, appealed and had his sentence changed to life imprisonment
- Rade Garić, former Bosnian Serb police reservist convicted for inhumane acts
- Miodrag Grubačić, Bosnian Serb detention camp guard who mistreated and abused Bosniak and Croat civilian detainees
- Becir Hujić, convicted of illegally detaining Serb and Croat civilians at Silos camp
- Boban Inđić, former Bosnian Serb commander, sentenced to 15 years in prison for participation in the Štrpci massacre
- Goran Jelisić (born 1968), Bosnian Serb sentenced to 40 years for murders in Brčko. Personally killed 13 civilians
- Mićo Jurišić, former Bosnian Serb Policeman who committed crimes against humanity to non-Serb civilians
- Nermin Kalember, convicted of illegally detaining Serb and Croat civilians at Silos camp
- Radovan Karadžić (born 1945), Bosnian Serb politician who served as President of Republika Srpska during the Bosnian War, sentenced to life in prison for eleven counts of war crimes
- Radomir Kezunović, former Bosnian Serb Army military policeman for killing 28 civilians
- Dragan Kolundžija (born 1959), Bosnian Serb, sentenced to 3 years for Keraterm camp
- Milojica Kos, Bosnian Serb, sentenced to 6 years for Omarska camp
- Radomir Kovač (born 1961), Bosnian Serb sentenced to 20 years
- Momčilo Krajišnik, Bosnian Serb politician, sentenced to 27 years
- Milorad Krnojelac, Bosnian Serb sentenced to 7½ years for the Foča massacres. Following an appeal, his sentence was raised to 15 years
- Radislav Krstić, Bosnian Serb sentenced to 46 years (35 following appeal) for his part in the Srebrenica massacre, also found guilty of being an accomplice to genocide, first such ruling at the ICTY
- Dalibor Krstović, Bosnian Serb Army soldier who raped a POW
- Dragoljub Kunarac (born 1960), Bosnian Serb sentenced to 28 years
- Miroslav Kvocka, Bosnian Serb, sentenced to 7 years for Omarska camp

==== L–Z ====
- Esad Landžo, Bosniak sentenced to 15 years for crimes at Čelebići prison camp
- Jovan Lipovac, Serbian member of the White Eagles, sentenced to 10 years in 2023 for participation in the Štrpci massacre
- Gojko Lukić, Serbian member of the White Eagles, sentenced to 10 years in 2023 for participation in the Štrpci massacre
- Milan Lukić (born 1967), commander of the White Eagles, sentenced to life in prison for his role in the Višegrad massacres.
- Sakib Mahmuljin, former Bosnian general convicted of killing Prisoners of War
- Željko Maričić, Bosnian Serb soldier, sentenced to two years for crimes against civilians
- Dragan Marinković, convicted of committing crimes against humanity in Milići, Republika Srpska
- Šerif Mešanović, convicted of illegally detaining Serb and Croat civilians at Silos camp
- Dragomir Milošević (born 1942), Bosnian Serb soldier in the Army of Republika Srpska, sentenced to 29 years in prison for war crimes committed during the Siege of Sarajevo.
- Ratko Mladić (1943-2026), officer in the Army of Republika Srpska, sentenced to life in prison for roles in the Siege of Sarajevo and Srebrenica massacre
- Darko Mrđa, former Bosnian Serb policeman, sentenced to 20 years for participating in the Korićani Cliffs massacre
- Husein Mujanović, Bosnian Army Jail Chief, sentenced to ten years for prisoner abuse, sentence later reduced to 4.5 years
- Zdravko Narančić, Bosnian Serb soldier convicted of helping kill 11 POWs
- Dragan Nikolić, Bosnian Serb sentenced to 23 years
- Slavko Ognjenović, convicted for wartime rape
- Osman Osmanović, Bosnian war official, sentenced to five years in prison for abusing prisoners at Rasadnik camp
- Veljko Papić, former member of the Army of Republika Srpska, sentenced to two years for forced labor
- Radovan Paprica, convicted for wartime rape in the Yugoslav war
- Milivoj Petković, Bosnian Croat officer for crimes against humanity and ethnic cleansing
- Stojan Petrović, member of the Bosnian Serb police, convicted of rape and crimes against the civilian population, sentenced to seven years in prison
- Joja Plavanjac, Bosnian Serb soldier convicted of killing 11 POWs
- Biljana Plavšić (born 1930), Bosnian Serb politician and former president of Republika Srpska. Sentenced to 11 years
- Dragoljub Pricac, Bosnian Serb, sentenced to 5 years for Omarska camp
- Predrag Prosić, Bosnian Serb soldier convicted of illegally detaining Bosniak civilians
- Nicholas Ribić (born 1974), Canadian soldier in the Army of Republika Srpska, convicted of taking United Nations peacekeepers hostage to use as human shields.
- Blagoje Simić (born 1960), former Bosnian Serb member of the Serb War Presidency, sentenced to 15 years for aiding and abetting persecution through unlawful arrests, confinement of prisoners in inhumane conditions, forced labour and displacement
- Simo Stupar, former Serbian policeman who illegally detained Bosniaks
- Dusko Vasiljević, Serbian member of the White Eagles, sentenced to 10 years in 2023 for participation in the Štrpci massacre
- Simo Zarić, former police chief of Bosanski Šamac, sentenced to six years for being an aider and abettor of persecutions during the Bosanski Šamac ethnic cleansing

=== Croatian War of Independence ===
- Milan Babić (1956–2006), Croatian Serb and former prime minister of Republic of Serb Krajina, sentenced to 13 years in prison
- Branimir Glavaš (born 1956), former Croatian major general convicted of ethnic cleansing and torturing POWs
- Ante Gotovina, former Croatian lieutenant general, sentenced to 24 years in prison for the expulsion of ethnic Serbs, conviction eventually overturned
- Mirko Graorac, Croatian Serb traffic policemen, sentenced to 20 years for being a guard at Manjača camp, sentenced later reduced to 15 years, served a total of nine years in prison before release
- Miodrag Jokić (born 1935), commander of the Yugoslav Navy, sentenced to 7 years in prison for war crimes committed during the Siege of Dubrovnik.
- Rajko Kričković, former Croatian soldier convicted of killing a civilian family in the Yugoslav Wars
- Jure Kordić, Bosnian Croat member of the Croatian Defence Council, sentenced to three years in prison for illegally detaining and mistreating civilians
- Josip Krmpotić, Croatian Army commander, sentenced to three years in prison for destroying houses during Operation Medak Pocket
- Dražen Lovrić, Bosnian Croat member of the Croatian Defence Council, sentenced to one year in prison for illegally detaining and mistreating civilians
- Mladen Markač, former Croatian general, sentenced to 18 years in prison for the expulsion of ethnic Serbs, conviction eventually overturned
- Milan Martić (born 1954), President and defence minister of Croatian Serbs during Croatian War of Independence, sentenced to 35 years
- Boro Milojica, former Bosnian Serb soldier for killing civilians
- Darko Mrđa, Bosnian Serb policeman who persecuted Bosniaks
- Mile Mrkšić (1947–2015), Serb General convicted to 20 years for the Vukovar massacre
- Josip Mršić, Croatian Army soldier and member of the 9th Guards Brigade, sentenced to three years in prison for killing an elderly woman during Operation Medak Pocket
- Zdravko Mucić, Bosnian Croat sentenced to 9 years for Čelebići prison camp
- Mirko Norac (born 1967), Croatian Army general sentenced to 12 years in prison for various war crimes committed during the Croatian War of Independence.
- Slobodan Praljak (1945–2017), Bosnian Croat general sentenced to 20 years in prison by the ICC for war crimes committed against the Bosniak population. He committed suicide upon hearing of the verdict.
- Mlađo Radić Bosnian Serb, sentenced to 20 years for Omarska camp
- Ivica Rajić (born 1958), Bosnian Croat sentenced to 12 years
- Tonćo Rajić, former member of the Croatian Defence Forces who mistreated POWs at Dretelj camp
- Mirsad Sabić, convicted of illegally detaining Serb and Croat civilians at Silos camp
- Duško Sikirica (born 1964), Bosnian Serb, sentenced to 15 years for Keraterm camp
- Franko Simatović (born 1950), convicted for crimes in the Yugoslav Wars
- Blagoje Simić (born 1960), Bosnian Serb sentenced to 17 years for Bosanski Šamac
- Milan Šimić (born 1960), Bosnian Serb sentenced to 5 years
- Veselin Šljivančanin, Serb Colonel convicted to 5 years for the Vukovar massacre
- Velibor Solaja, Croatian Army soldier and member of the 9th Guards Brigade, sentenced to five years in prison for killing an elderly woman during Operation Medak Pocket
- Milomir Stakić (born 1962), Bosnian Serb sentenced to life imprisonment for war crimes in Prijedor and nearby concentration camps
- Jovica Stanišić (born 1950), convicted for crimes in the Yugoslav Wars
- Pavle Strugar (born 1933), Serb general in the Siege of Dubrovnik. Sentenced to 8 years
- Duško Tadić, Bosnian Serb sentenced to 25 years
- Miroslav Tadić (born 1937), Bosnian Serb sentenced to 8 years for Bosanski Šamac
- Nedzad Tinjak, Bosnian Croat member of the Croatian Defence Council, sentenced to 12 years in prison for illegally detaining and mistreating civilians
- Stevan Todorović, Bosnian Serb sentenced to 10 years for Bosanski Šamac
- Zdravko Tolimir (1948–2016), Bosnian Serb soldier in the Army of Republika Srpska, sentenced to life in prison for his involvement in the Srebrenica massacre
- Aleksandar Vasiljević, former Serbian Major General, sentenced to 20 years in prison for crimes against civilians and Prisoners of War
- Mitar Vasiljević (1954–2023), Bosnian Serb sentenced to 20 years, later lowered to 15 years for war crimes in Višegrad
- Dragan Vasiljković, convicted war criminal and the former commander of a Serb paramilitary unit called the Knindže or ("Knin ninjas") during the Yugoslav Wars.
- Goran Viskovic (born 1954), former member of the Bosnian Serb Army who was convicted of participating in a widespread and systematic attack against the non-Serb population in the Yugoslav Wars
- Zoran Vuković (born 1955), Bosnian Serb sentenced to 12 years
- Simo Zarić (born 1948), Bosnian Serb sentenced to 6 years for Bosanski Šamac
- Zoran Žigić, Bosnian Serb, sentenced to 25 years for Omarska camp

=== Croat–Bosniak War ===
- Zlatko Aleksovski (born 1960), Bosnian Croat commander of a prison facility, sentenced to 7 years
- Mario Cerkez (born 1959), Bosnian Croat sentenced to 6 years
- Edin Džeko, Bosnian who committed atrocities during the Trusina massacre, extradited and convicted in 2014
- Drago Josipović (born 1955), Bosnian Croat sentenced to 15, changed to 12 years following appeal
- Indira Kamerić, former member of the Croatian Defence Council, sentenced to four years in prison for torture and inhumane treatment of civilians
- Dario Kordić (born 1960), Bosnian Croat, sentenced to 25 years
- Vinko Martinović (born 1963), Bosnian Croat sentenced to 18 years
- Jadranko Prlić, Prime Minister of the Croatian Republic of Herzeg-Bosnia (1993–1996), sentenced to 25 years for crimes against humanity
- Vladimir Šantić (born 1958), Bosnian Croat sentenced to 25 years, changed to 18 following appeal
- Almir Sarajlić, Bosnian soldier, sentenced to 20 years for participation in the Križančevo selo massacre
- Mladen Naletilić Tuta (born 1946), Bosnian Croat sentenced to 20 years

=== Kosovo War ===
- Muhamet Alidemaj, former member of the Serbian police, convicted for participating in the Izbica massacre, sentenced to 15 years in prison
- Svetomir Bačević, Kosovo Serb, convicted of seizing a civilian home, sentenced to five years in prison
- Ekrem Bajrović, Kosovo Bosniak member of the Serbian forces, convicted of beating, torture and killing of ethnic Albanian civilians, sentenced to 12 years in prison
- Haradin Bala (1957–2018), Commander of the Kosovo Liberation Army, sentenced to 13 years for murder, torture, and cruel treatment at the Lapušnik prison camp
- Boban Bogićević, member of the Yugoslav Army’s 177th intervention squad, convicted of killing Albanian civilians, sentenced to two years in prison
- Dejan Bulatović, member of the Yugoslav Army’s 177th intervention squad, convicted of killing Albanian civilians, sentenced to 20 years in prison
- Zoran Đokić, former Serb fighter, sentenced to 12 years for attacks against ethnic Albanians
- Caslav Jolić, former Serbian policeman, convicted of torture against civilians, sentenced to eight years in prison
- Slaviša Kastratović, member of the Yugoslav Army’s 177th intervention squad, convicted of killing Albanian civilians, sentenced to two years in prison
- Zlatan Krstić, former Serb police officer, sentenced to 14.5 years for torture, destruction of property, expulsions and abductions
- Vladimir Lazarević, Serbian colonel general, convicted of aiding and abetting crimes against humanity, released in 2015
- Sreten Lukić (born 1955), former Chief of the Serbian Police, sentenced to 22 years in prison
- Sami Lushtaku, former KLA senior member, sentenced to 12 years in prison for murdering an Albanian civilian
- Toplica Miladinović, former Yugoslav Army commander convicted of ordering the invasion of Ljubenić, Pavlan, Zahac and Cuska, sentenced to 20 years in prison
- Siniša Mišić, member of the Yugoslav Army’s 177th intervention squad, convicted of killing Albanian civilians, sentenced to five years in prison
- Ranko Momić, member of the Yugoslav Army’s 177th intervention squad, convicted of killing Albanian civilians, sentenced to 15 years in prison
- Salih Mustafa (born 1972), former KLA commander, convicted in 2022 and sentenced to 26 years in prison for mistreating prisoners
- Milojko Nikolić, member of the Yugoslav Army’s 177th intervention squad, convicted of killing Albanian civilians, sentenced to 20 years in prison
- Dragoljub Ojdanić (1941–2020), former Chief of the General Staff of the Armed Forces of Yugoslavia, sentenced to 15 years in prison for committing acts of forced displacement during the Kosovo War
- Nebojša Pavković (born 1946), Serbian general convicted of crimes against humanity
- Srecko Popovic, member of the Yugoslav Army’s 177th intervention squad, convicted of killing Albanian civilians, sentenced to 10 years in prison
- Nikola Šainović, former Prime Minister of Serbia, convicted of crimes against humanity and released in 2015
- Sylejman Selimi (born 1970), former KLA senior member, sentenced to six years in prison for torturing a civilian
- Destan Shabanaj, former Serb police inspector, sentenced to 7 years for desecrating, humiliating and subjecting dead bodies to demeaning treatment
- Pjeter Shala, KLA fighter, convicted of arbitrary detention and torture, sentenced to 18 years in prison
- Remzi Shala, Kosovo Liberation Army fighter, convicted of kidnapping and killing a civilian, sentenced to nine and a half years
- Abdulah Sokić, member of the Yugoslav Army’s 177th intervention squad, convicted of killing Albanian civilians, sentenced to 12 years in prison
- Goran Stanišić, Serbian reservist policeman, convicted of killing 13 civilians, sentenced to 20 years in prison in 2021, later reduced to 15 years

=== Slovenian War of Independence ===
- Berisav Popov, former Yugoslav colonel, sentenced to five years in prison in absentia for killing civilians and destruction of property

=== Insurgency in Macedonia ===
- Johan Tarčulovski, former Macedonian police officer, sentenced to 12 years in prison for murder, wanton destruction and cruel treatment

== Ituri conflict ==
- Thomas Lubanga Dyilo (born 1960), leader of the Union of Congolese Patriots during the Ituri conflict, sentenced to 14 years in prison for the crime of forcibly conscripting child soldiers.
- Germain Katanga (born 1978), former leader of the Patriotic Resistance Front of Ituri, sentenced to 12 years in prison for his role in the Bogoro massacre.

== War in Afghanistan ==
- Robert Bales (born 1973), United States Army soldier, sentenced to life in prison without the possibility of parole for perpetrating the Kandahar massacre
- Alexander Blackman, Royal Marine convicted of executing a wounded Taliban insurgent, conviction was later downgraded to manslaughter.
- Calvin Gibbs, United States Army soldier, sentenced to life imprisonment for the thrill-killing of three Afghan civilians
- James R. Hayes, United States Army soldier, convicted of beating prisoners
- Andrew Holmes, United States Army soldier, sentenced to seven years in prison for participating in the murder of civilian Gul Mudin
- Omar Khadr (born 1986), Canadian convicted for murder and supporting terrorism
- Jeremy Morlock, United States Army soldier, sentenced to 24 years in prison for participating in the thrill-killings of three Afghan civilians
- Kevin Myricks, United States Army sergeant, convicted of beating prisoners
- Glendale Wells, specialist; pleaded guilty to being an accessory in the death of a prisoner known as Dilawar
- Adam Winfield, United States Army soldier, sentenced to three years in prison for involvement in the murder of civilian Mullah Adahdad

== Iraq War ==
=== Non-Iraqi participants ===
- Cardenas J. Alban (born 1975), convicted of killing a child
- James P. Barker, sentenced to 90 years in prison for participating in the Mahmudiyah rape and killings
- Michael Behenna (born 1983), United States Army soldier, convicted of killing prisoner Ali Mansur, pardoned in 2019
- Santos Cardona (1974-2009), convicted of torturing detainees at Ab Ghraib prison
- Paul E. Cortez, sentenced to 100 years in prison for participating in the Mahmudiyah rape and killings
- Lynndie England (born 1982), member of the US Army reserve, sentenced to three years in prison for her role in the Abu Ghraib scandal, released on parole after serving 2 years
- Ivan Frederick (born 1966), convicted of torturing detainees at Abu Ghraib prison
- Charles Graner (born 1968), member of the US Army reserve, sentenced to 10 years in prison for his role in the Abu Ghraib scandal, released on parole after serving six years
- Steven Dale Green (1985-2014), US Army soldier, sentenced to life in prison without the possibility of parole for his role in the Mahmudiyah rape and killings
- Sabrina Harman, jailed for six months for abusing detainees at Abu Ghraib prison
- John E. Hatley, sentenced to life imprisonment for murdering four detainees
- Donald Payne (born 1970), first member of the British armed forces to be convicted of killing Baha Mousa, jailed for one year and dismissed from the army
- Jeremy Sivits, jailed for one year for abusing detainees at Abu Ghraib prison
- Jesse V. Spielman, sentenced to 110 years in prison for participating in the Mahmudiyah rape and killings

=== Saddam Hussein regime ===
- Ali Daeem Ali (1940–2015), Baathist official, sentenced to 15 years
- Frans van Anraat (born 1942), Dutch arms dealer who sold raw materials for the production of chemical weapons to Saddam Hussein, sentenced to 15 years in prison
- Tariq Aziz (1936–2015), foreign minister under Saddam Hussein, death sentence later commuted to life imprisonment where he died in custody
- Awad Hamed al-Bandar (1945–2007), chief judge, sentenced to death
- Saddam Hussein (1937–2006), President of Iraq from 1979 to 2003, executed by hanging for the Dujail Massacre in 2006
- Sabawi Ibrahim al-Tikriti (1947–2013), Directorate of General Security
- Abid Hamid Mahmud (1957–2012), military officer
- Ali Hassan al-Majid (1941–2010), Baathist Defense Minister, executed for war crimes, crimes against humanity, genocide
- Aziz Saleh Nuhmah (born 1941), governor of Kuwait during the Iraqi occupation
- Taha Yassin Ramadan (1938–2007), Vice President, 1991–2003, sentenced to life imprisonment, appealed to death
- Abdullah Kadhem Ruaid (died 2011), Baathist official, sentenced to 15 years
- Mizhar Abdullah Ruaid (born 1949), Baathist official, sentenced to 15 years
- Barzan Ibrahim al-Tikriti (1951–2007), head of Mukhabarat, sentenced to death and executed
- Watban Ibrahim (1952–2015), interior minister
- Saadoun al-Qaisi (1947–2026) Security officer, sentenced to death and executed by hanging for murdering Muhammad Baqir al-Sadr and Amina al-Sadr in 1980.

== Syrian Civil War ==
- Mustafa A, member of Liwa al-Quds, sentenced to 12 years in prison for complicity in torture, inhumane treatment and illegal arrest, and membership of a criminal organization
- Mohammad Abdullah, soldier, convicted of appearing in photos standing over a pile of bodies
- Eyad al-Gharib, intelligence officer who aided crimes against humanity
- Ahmad al Khedr, convicted for killing a captured Assad regime soldier
- Ahmad Al-Y, Syrian man who fought with terrorist organization Ahrar al-Sham
- Jamil Hassan, former director of the Syrian Air Force Intelligence Directorate, convicted of crimes against humanity in absentia
- Abdel Salam Mahmoud, former head of investigations, convicted of crimes against humanity in absentia
- Ali Mamlouk, Deputy Vice President for Security Affairs, convicted of crimes against humanity in absentia
- Alaa Mousa, doctor convicted of torturing and killing opponents of the Syrian regime at a military hospital in Damascus
- Majdi Nema, former spokesman for Jaysh al-Islam
- Anwar Raslan, Colonel convicted of crimes committed on behalf of President Bashar al-Assad
- Atef Najib, head of political security in Daraa Governorate

== Central African Republic Civil War ==
- Yauba Ousman, convicted in 2022 for the 2019 Ouham-Pendé killings.
- Issa Salleh, convicted in 2022 for the 2019 Ouham-Pendé killings.
- Mahamat Tahir, convicted in 2022 for the 2019 Ouham-Pendé killings.

== Islamic State in Syria and Iraq ==
- Oussama Achraf Akhlafa, Islamic State militant, sentenced to 7½ years in prison
- Eddie Gallagher, US Navy SEAL who stabbed a injured POW and took photos with the corpse, pardoned in 2019.
- Lina Ishaq, Syrian woman who allowed her pre-teenage son join the Islamic State leading to his death, sentenced to six years at a Swedish tribunal
- Nurten J., German woman who travelled to Syria to join ISIS and committed war crimes against property
- Taha al-Jumailly, IS member, sentenced to life in prison for killing a child during the Yazidi genocide.
- Twana H.S. and Asia R.A., Iraqi Kurdish former couple and members of the Islamic State, convicted by the Higher Regional Court of Munich in the 2026 Munich Yazidi genocide trial of genocide, crimes against humanity, severe child sexual abuse, human trafficking and war crimes over the enslavement and abuse of two Yazidi girls.
- Osama Krayem, IS member who took part in the murder of downed Jordanian airman Muath al-Kasasbeh
- Clint Lorance, United States First Lieutenant who ordered the shooting of two civilians on a motorcycle, pardoned in 2019

== Russian invasion of Ukraine ==
It has been reported that there have been 81 convictions for war crimes since the invasion as of February 2024. Many of these convictions were made with defendants in absentia.

- Alexander Bobikin, member of an artillery unit, convicted of violating the laws and customs of war
- Anton Cherednik, member of Ukrainian naval infantry, pleaded guilty to murdering a civilian during the Siege of Mariupol
- Pavlo Hrebenyuk, member of the People's Militia of the Donetsk People's Republic, convicted of brutal treatment of the civilian population and sentenced to 12 years in prison
- Alexander Ivanov, member of an artillery unit, convicted of violating the laws and customs of war
- Mykhail Kulikov, tank crewman, convicted of firing on civilian targets
- Denis Kuznetsov, Russian soldier who took part in torturing a civilian, Oleksandr Marusik, convicted in absentia without a prison sentence
- Vadim Shishimarin, Russian soldier who killed unarmed civilian Oleksandr Shelipov, sentenced to life in prison

== Others ==
=== Africa ===
- al-Hassan Ag Abdoul Aziz (born 1977), Malian Islamist militant, convicted of torture during the Northern Mali conflict
- Jean-Pierre Bemba (born 1962), Congolese politician and former rebel leader, sentenced to 18 years in prison for war crimes and sexual crimes committed in the Central African Republic, but the conviction was served 10 years of his original sentence
- Hissène Habré (1942-2021), former President of Chad convicted of rape and ordering the killing and torture of thousands of political opponents
- Khalifa Haftar (born 1943), Supreme Commander of the Libyan National Army (2015–present), convicted of extrajudicial killings and torture
- Alieu Kosiah (born 1975), former commander of the United Liberation Movement of Liberia for Democracy sentenced for rape and murder
- Ahmad al-Faqi al-Mahdi (born 1975), member of Ansar Dine, sentenced to 9 years in prison for the war crime of attacking various religious buildings during the Northern Mali conflict.
- Mengistu Haile Mariam (born 1937), Chairman of the Derg, sentenced to death in absentia for his role in the Red Terror
- Bosco Ntaganda (born 1973), former chief of staff of the National Congress for the Defence of the People, sentenced to 30 years' imprisonment for war crimes
- Dominic Ongwen (born 1975), commander of the Ugandan rebel group the Lord's Resistance Army who was convicted of crimes against women, including forced pregnancy

=== Asia ===
- Yuri Budanov (1963–2011), officer of the Russian Armed Forces, sentenced to ten years in prison for war crimes committed during both the First and Second Chechen Wars, later released on parole after serving four years
- Mikhail Golovatov (1949–2022), KGB officer, sentenced to twelve years in prison for his role in the January Events
- Hamid Nouri (born 1961), Iranian official sentenced to life in prison for executing political prisoners
- Yan Petrovsky (born 1987), convicted of mutilating and killing prisoners during the war in Donbas
- Dmitry Yazov (1924–2020), Soviet Minister of Defence, sentenced to ten years in prison for his role in the January Events
- Faryadi Sarwar Zardad (born 1963), Afghan warlord convicted of torture and hostage-taking

=== Europe ===
- Jean-Baptiste Carrier (1756–1794), convicted and executed for murdering 4,000 civilians during the French Revolution
- Carlo Fantom (died 1643), executed for raping a civilian woman during the English Civil War
- Costas Georgiou (1951–1976), convicted of massacring 14 fellow mercenaries during the Angolan Civil War, executed by firing squad
- Peter Handcock (1868–1902), convicted and executed for murdering civilians during the Second Boer War
- Breaker Morant (1864–1902), convicted and executed for illegal summary executions of Boer and other prisoners during the Second Boer War
- Peter von Hagenbach (c. 1420 – May 9, 1474), executed for commanding troops who committed rape during the occupation of Breisach
- George Witton (1874–1942), convicted of murdering nine POWs during the Second Boer War

=== North America ===
- William Calley (1943–2024), United States Army soldier who was one of the main perpetrators of the Mỹ Lai massacre during the Vietnam War, initially sentenced to life in prison, but this was later changed to house arrest, and he was released on parole three years later
- Harry Cline (died 1902), U.S. Army soldier who shot four small Filipino boys, killing one, who were gathering grass during the Philippine–American War, executed by hanging
- John E. Day Jr. (died 1959), U.S. private who shot and killed a South Korean civilian, raped his wife, and killed their baby daughter during the Korean War, executed
- Cipriano and Joseph Garcia, U.S. Privates First Class sentenced to four and fifteen years imprisonment respectively for participating in the rape and murder of a Vietnamese woman during the Vietnam War, Joseph Garcia was later acquitted on appeal
- David Gervase, U.S. Sergeant sentenced to 10 years' imprisonment with hard labor for instigating the gang-rape and murder of a Vietnamese woman during the Vietnam War
- Edwin Forbes Glenn (1857–1926), U.S. Army Major General who waterboarded detainees in the Philippines during the Philippine–American War, given a fine and taken out of command for one month
- Inocente Orlando Montano, Salvadoran army colonel convicted for the 1989 murders of Jesuits in El Salvador during the Salvadoran civil war
- Steven Cabbot Thomas, U.S. Private First Class sentenced to life imprisonment for raping and murdering a Vietnamese woman during the Vietnam War

=== South America ===
- Alberto Fujimori, President of Peru (1990–2000) who was convicted of participation in kidnappings and human rights violations during the Shining Path insurgency.
- Telmo Hurtado, major in the Peruvian army who participated in the Accomarca massacre
- Juan Rivera Rondon, Lieutenant in the Peruvian army who participated in the Accomarca massacre
