= War Crimes Act =

There are two acts known as the War Crimes Act

- War Crimes Act 1991 of the United Kingdom
- War Crimes Act of 1996 of the United States

== See also ==
- Crimes Against Humanity and War Crimes Act of Canada
