= Anne Spoerry =

French physician (1918–1999)

- Born: Anne Marie Spoerry; May 13, 1918; Cannes, France
- Died: February 2, 1999 (aged 80); Nairobi, Kenya
- Education: University of Basel
- Occupations: Physician, pilot
- Known for: AMREF Flying Doctors
- Notable work: On m'appelle Mama Daktari (1994)
- Relatives: François Spoerry (brother)

Anne Spoerry (13 May 1918 – 2 February 1999) was a French-born physician, based for most of her career in Kenya as a "flying doctor" affiliated with Amref Health Africa.

== Early life and education ==
Anne Marie Spoerry was born in Cannes, France, the daughter of Henry Spoerry and Jeanne Schlumberger. Her brother was architect François Spoerry. As a girl she attended the Francis Holland School in London. While she was still in medical school in Paris, she joined the French resistance during World War II. She was arrested in 1943, and spent some time in the German Ravensbrück concentration camp for her activities.

== Inmate at Ravensbrück ==
Spoerry's actions at the camp have been controversial; known as "Dr. Claude," she became a friend and possibly a lover of her bloc's notorious kapo, Carmen Mory, and she has been accused of torturing the prisoners. After World War II, Spoerry finished her studies in tropical medicine at the University of Basel. However, she has also been charged by the Central Registry of War Criminals and Security Suspects, and subsequently she was tried in both a court in Switzerland and a military tribunal in Paris for complicity in crimes on prisoners including torture; she was found not guilty. A Free French Forces "Court of Honour" in Paris in 1946, however, "found Spoerry guilty of impersonating a doctor, being a traitor to the French and bringing shame on France through inhumane behaviour. She was disbarred from the Free French Forces and exiled from France for 25 years."

== New life in Africa ==
Spoerry departed France in 1948, first finding work as a doctor at a women's hospital in Yemen, and eventually settling in the Kenyan highlands, where she lived on a cooperative farm and practised medicine. She also founded the first Girl Guides troop in the region. At Kenyan independence, she decided to stay and purchased a small farm. In her forties, Spoerry learned to pilot a small plane so that she could practise medicine over a wider rural area, and reach island populations. In 1963 she became the first female member of the AMREF "Flying Doctors," delivering babies and administering vaccines along with other medical care. In her work, she also carried mail and basic supplies to remote locations. Richard Leakey praised Spoerry's work, saying, "She probably saved more lives than any other individual in east Africa – if not the whole continent."

Spoerry's memoir, On m'appelle Mama Daktari, was published in French in 1994.

Spoerry died in 1999, age 80, after a stroke in Nairobi; she was buried on the island of Lamu. A team of seaborne doctors and veterinarians in the same archipelago named their project for Spoerry.

== Remembrance ==
In 2018 author and researcher John Heminway published a biography of Spoerry, which examined in detail her wartime activities and then her work in Africa. His research also shed light on Spoerry's controversial World War II past.
