= July 2005 Afghan captive incident =

Incident in Uruzgan Province, Afghanistan

- Part of War in Afghanistan (2001–2021)
- Venue: Forward Operating Base (FOB) Ripley
- Location: 32°36′50″N 65°52′00″E
- Injuries: 2
- Convictions: 2

In October 2005 two soldiers were investigated for beating captives held in Forward Operating Base Ripley (now Multi National Base Tarin Kot), in July 2005, in Uruzgan Province, Afghanistan. The two soldiers were Sergeant Kevin D. Myricks and Specialist James R. Hayes.

On January 30, 2006, Myricks and Hayes were found guilty of one count of conspiracy to maltreat and two counts of maltreatment in the beating of Afghani captives. Myricks was reduced in rank to private, and sentenced to six months' imprisonment. Hayes was reduced in rank to private, and sentenced to four months' imprisonment.

David R. Irvine, a former Law Professor and retired Brigadier General compared Myricks' sentence for beatings to the lack of charges against commissioned officers in earlier murder incidents.

"That no senior officers have been as severely dealt with as junior enlisted personnel is a travesty. Chief Warrant Officer Welshofer received the merest tap on the wrist for negligent homicide; Major Voss was given immunity from prosecution. Colonel Teeples has a new job as the Executive Assistant to the Chairman of the Joint Chiefs of Staff. Three junior enlisted soldiers, convicted for their roles at Abu Ghraib, were imprisoned for ten, eight, and three years—and they didn’t kill anyone. Sgt. Kevin Myricks, convicted of punching detainees in Afghanistan, was recently sentenced to six months’ confinement and reduced in rank to private."

According to the BBC News:

"The charges against the soldiers came in October, close on the heels of accusations that US forces had burned the bodies of Taleban fighters, an act considered sacrilege in Islam."

== See also ==
- Abu Ghraib torture and prisoner abuse
- Bagram torture and prisoner abuse
