= Death of Abed Hamed Mowhoush =

2003 death of Iraqi general

Abed Hamed Mowhoush
- عبد حمد مهاوش
- Born: 19 July 1947; Rawa, Iraq
- Died: 26 November 2003 (aged 56); Al-Qa'im Detention Centre, Iraq
- Military career
- Allegiance: Baathist Iraq
- Branch: Iraqi Air Force
- Service years: 1969–2003
- Rank: Major-general; Air vice-marshal
- Unit: No.6 Transport Squadron( An-12 )
- Commands: Transport and Strategic Airlift Command; Eastern Air Command; No. 4 Transport Group
- Conflicts: Iran–Iraq War; First Gulf War

Abed Hamed Mowhoush (Arabic: عبد حمد مهاوش) was an Iraqi air vice-marshal believed to be in command of the transport, logistics and airlifting division of the Iraqi Air Force during the regime of Saddam Hussein immediately prior to the 2003 Invasion of Iraq, until his surrender to United States forces on 10 November 2003. He died on 26 November 2003 while in U.S. custody at the Al-Qaim detention facility approximately 200 miles (320 km) northwest of Baghdad, following a 16-day period of detention.

Mowhoush was commissioned as a heavy transport and airlift pilot officer in 1969 and commanded a wing of An-12 and An-26 heavy cargo planes during the Iran–Iraq War. He was in charge of airlifting logistics operations in the Iraqi Southern Air Command during the Gulf War. He was promoted to brigadier/air commodore rank in 1991 and in 1994 placed in charge of the Eastern Air Command. He was appointed as the commander of the Transport and Strategic Airlifting Command in 1999. He had a total of 3125 hours of logged flying experience on his log from 1969 until 1997 on the An-12, Il-76, and An-26.

U.S. forces initially claimed that Mowhoush had been captured during a raid and that he had died of natural causes, but The Washington Post later reported that he had given himself up in an effort to secure the release of his sons. In 2005, four U.S. servicemen were charged in relation to the killing.

== Controversy over U.S. claims ==
The circumstances of Mowhoush's capture, detention and death appear to have been the subject of a campaign of misinformation by U.S. military authorities, who retracted or amended several of their initial claims.

- It was initially claimed that Mowhoush had been captured during a raid, but it was later admitted that he had voluntarily surrendered.
- Information which was initially released indicated that Mowhoush was cooperating and had revealed the names of key insurgents, but it was later admitted that he had revealed little during the period when he was well-treated and absolutely nothing after the tactics became harsh.
- Despite Mowhoush dying while being tortured, the U.S. military claimed in a news release that his death was brought about by natural causes.

According to The Washington Post:

Hours after Mowhoush's death in U.S. custody on 26 November 2003, military officials issued a news release stating that the prisoner had died of natural causes after complaining of feeling sick. Army psychological-operations officers quickly distributed leaflets designed to convince locals that the general had cooperated and outed key insurgents. The U.S. military initially told reporters that Mowhoush had been captured during a raid. In reality, he had walked into the Forward Operating Base "Tiger" in Qaim on 10 November 2003, hoping to speak with U.S. commanders to secure the release of his sons, who had been arrested in raids 11 days earlier.

== Investigation, arrests and trial ==
Mowhoush died while being tortured by coalition forces associated with the 66th Military Intelligence Brigade, the CIA and a group of Iraqi mercenaries hired by the CIA. His death was initially attributed to "natural causes" by coalition forces, with the official military report stated that "Mowhoush said he didn't feel well and subsequently lost consciousness". However, when the Abu Ghraib torture and prisoner abuse scandal erupted, the Pentagon acknowledged that the autopsy report indicated that the cause of death was "asphyxia due to smothering and chest compression", and that his body showed "evidence of blunt force trauma to the chest and legs". The report further stated that the general had suffocated "during interrogation by military intelligence, after having been interrogated by the CIA".

In 2004, four arrests were made in connection with Mowhoush's death: Chief Warrant Officer Lewis E. Welshofer Jr., and Chief Warrant Officer Jeff L. Williams, who were alleged to be the two soldiers conducting the interrogation, and Sergeant First Class William J. Sommer and Specialist Jerry L. Loper, who were assigned to the detention facility at the time of the interrogation, who also faced dereliction of duty charges.

According to The Washington Post:

Senior officers in charge of the facility near the Syrian border believed that such 'claustrophobic techniques' were approved ways to gain information from detainees, part of what military regulations refer to as a "fear up" tactic, according to military court documents.

The delay in the arrest of the accused was reportedly a result of their commanding officer, Colonel David Teeples, being reluctant to pursue charges and preferring a simple reprimand. It was not until the Denver Post ran a series of articles exposing the lenient treatment of the accused that military lawyers commenced prosecution proceedings under military law. Documents revealed during these proceedings confirmed that Mowhoush was physically abused and met his death at the hands of military interrogators:

It was inside the sleeping bag that the 56-year-old detainee took his last breath through broken ribs, lying on the floor beneath a U.S. soldier in Interrogation Room 6 in the western Iraqi desert. Two days before, a secret CIA-sponsored group of Iraqi paramilitaries, working with Army interrogators, had beaten Mowhoush nearly senseless, using fists, a club and a rubber hose, according to classified documents.

In 2005, charges of murder, assault and dereliction of duty were filed by the United States Army against Welshofer Jr. and the other servicemen in relation to the death of Mowhoush. This marked the first time that coalition servicemen from either the Iraq War or War in Afghanistan were charged with homicide related crimes.

== Criminal convictions ==
On January 21, 2006, an American military jury convicted Welshofer of negligent homicide and dereliction of duty in the death of Mowhoush but he was acquitted of the more severe charge of murder. The military jury ordered a reprimand and forfeiture of $6,000 in pay, and restricted him to his home, office and church for two months. However, he was not sentenced to time in prison.
