= SAO Northern Bosnia =

Self-proclaimed Serb Autonomous Region

Serb Autonomous Region of Northern Bosnia Српска аутономна област Северна Босна (Serbian) Srpska autonomna oblast Severna Bosna (Serbian)
- 1991–1992
- Flag Coat of arms

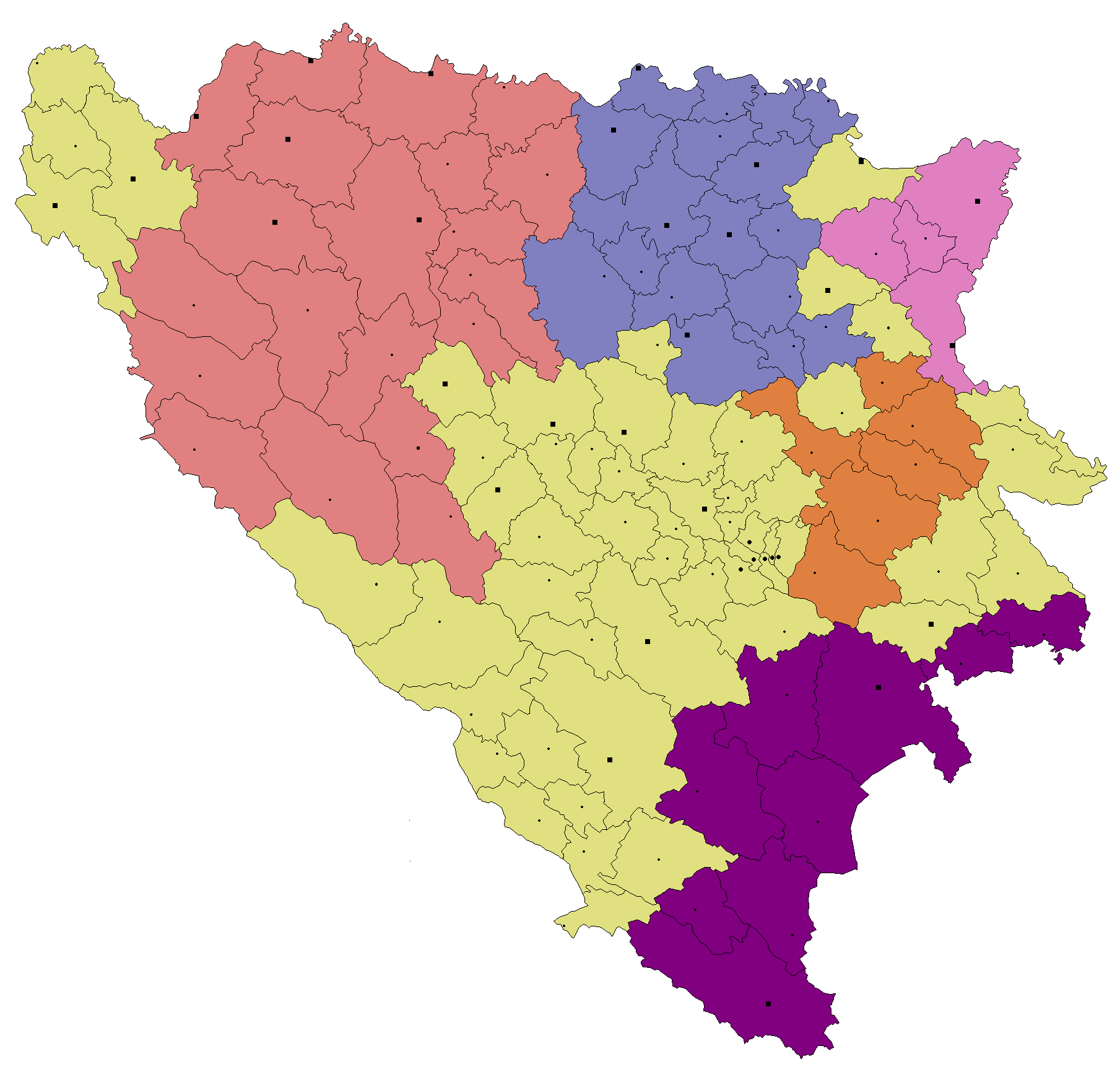
- Status: Self-proclaimed entity
- Capital: Doboj; 44°43′53″N 18°05′04″E
- Government: Provisional government
- President of the Assembly
  - 1991: Blagoje Simić (SDP-BaH)
- President of the Executive Council
  - 1991–1992: Nikola Perišić
- Historical era: Breakup of Yugoslavia
  - Established: 1991
  - Disestablished: 1992
Preceded by	Succeeded by
Socialist Republic of Bosnia and Herzegovina	Republika Srpska (1992–95)

SAO Northern Bosnia (Serbian: САО Сјеверна Босна / SAO Sjeverna Bosna) was a self-proclaimed ethnic Serb Autonomous Region (Serbian: САО / SAO) in the Socialist Republic of Bosnia and Herzegovina (SRBiH) in the prelude to the Bosnian War. It was established on 4 November 1991, being the last SAO to be proclaimed. It existed between November 1991 and 9 January 1992, when it became part of Republic of the Serb people of Bosnia and Herzegovina (later Republika Srpska). Blagoje Simić was the president of the Assembly of SAO Northern Bosnia from 4 November to 30 November 1991. Nikola Perišić was the President of the Executive Council of SAO Northern Bosnia from 4 November 1991 to 9 January 1992.

== Government ==
=== President of the Assembly ===
- Blagoje Simić (4 November 1991 – 30 November 1991)

=== President of the Executive Council ===
- Nikola Perišić (4 November 1991 – 9 January 1992)

== See also ==
- Serb Autonomous Regions
- SAO Bosanska Krajina
- SAO Romanija
- SAO North-East Bosnia
- SAO Herzegovina
