= Multi National Base Tarin Kot =

Temporary Dutch military base on the outskirts of Tarin Kowt

Multi National Base Tarin Kot
- Tarinkot, Tarinkot District, Uruzgan Province in Afghanistan
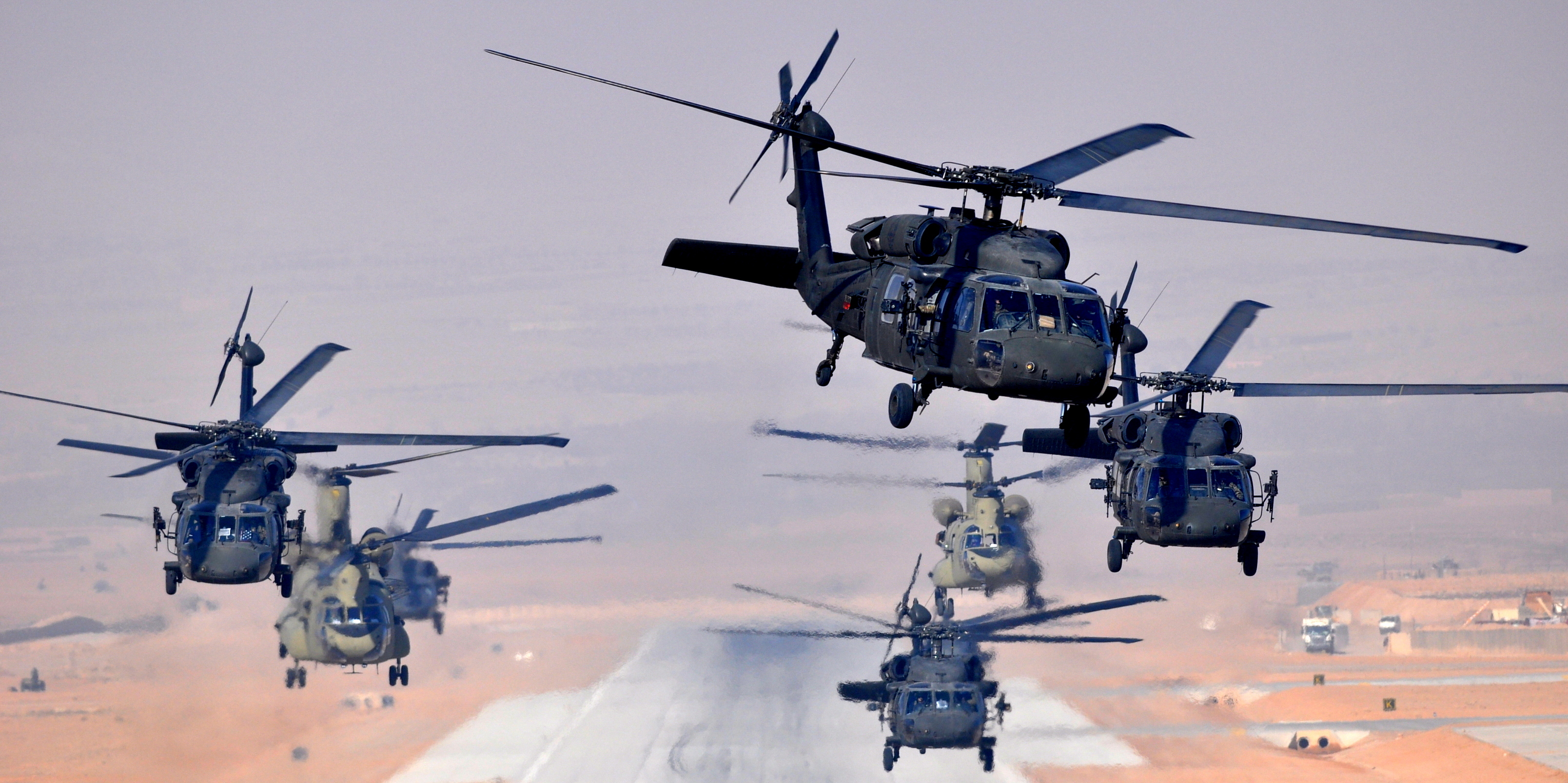
- NATO helicopters taking off at Tarinkot Airport in 2013

Site information
- Owner: Ministry of Defense (Afghanistan)
- Operator: Afghan Armed Forces
- Previous Operators: Australian Army; Royal Netherlands Army; United States Marine Corps

Location
- Shown within Afghanistan
- Coordinates: 32°36′50″N 65°52′00″E

Site history
- Built: 2004
- In use: 2004 - March 2020
- Fate: Handed to Afghan Control
- Events: July 2005 Afghan captive incident

Airfield information
Runways
Direction	Length and surface
12/30	2,225 metres (7,300 ft) Concrete
- Expanded August 2006

Multi National Base Tarin Kot is a former International Security Assistance Force (ISAF) installation, used by the Afghan National Army after the Netherlands Armed Forces' departure. The base was located on the outskirts of Tarinkot, the capital of Uruzgan Province in southern Afghanistan.

Under the previous operators, the base was used by multiple states including the Netherlands and Australia.

The base was divided into multiple areas:

- Camp Russell (Australia's Special Operations Task Group)
- Camp Holland
- Camp Cole American forces.
- On the opposite side of the runway is Tarinkot Airport, all sites use the same runway

== History ==
The site was initially Forward Operating Base (FOB) Ripley which was used by the United States Marine Corps, and in 2005/6 it was expanded to create "Kamp Holland".

In December 2009 approximately 1,300 Dutch and 390 Australian personnel were stationed at Kamp Holland.

The base was closed in mid-March 2020 due to the American forces' drawdown.

== Task Force Uruzgan ==
The first group of Dutch military personnel left for Afghanistan in March 2006 in the Deployment Task Force (DTF). They were the quartermasters for the following Dutch forces of the Task Force Uruzgan (TFU) becoming operational in August 2006.

The average strength was 1,200 personnel split over the locations "Tarinkot" and "Deh Rawod".

As the Task Force Uruzgan was a composite unit, it consisted of various units and specialties of the Dutch armed forces. Army, Air Force, Navy, Marines, Special Forces and Military Police personnel were completely integrated in the TFU.

The core of the TFU was the Battlegroup, consisting of infantry - Dutch Airmobile or Marines Battalion - and some 155mm mechanized howitzers for fire support. In case the Battlegroup needed close air support, the Dutch Air Task Force – consisting of F-16 multirole fighters stationed at Kandahar Airfield and AH-64D Apache combat helicopters stationed at Tarinkot – were tasked with providing it.

Key

- Task Force Uruzgan - detachment (TFU)
- Tactical Force Elements (TFE)
- Provincial Reconstruction Teams (PRT)

Units

- TFU-1. 11th Airmobile Brigade; August 2006 until January 2007 under Colonel T. Vleugels
  - TFE-1. 12th Infantry Battalion (Air Assault); August to November 2006
  - PRT-1. 42nd Tank Battalion Regiment Hussars Prince of Orange; August to November 2006
- TFU-2. 13th Mechanized Brigade; February to July 2007 under Colonel H. van Griensven
  - TFE-2. 17th Infantry Battalion "Prinses Irene Fusiliers"; December 2006 to March 2007
  - PRT-2. 11th Tank Battalion Regiment Hussars of Sytzama; December 2006 to March 2007
- TFU-3. 11th Airmobile Brigade; August 2007 until January 2008 under Colonel N. Geerts
  - TFE-3. 42nd Infantry Battalion "Limburgse Jagers"; April to July 2007
  - TFE-4. 13th Infantry Regiment "Prince Bernhard Stoottroepen" (Air Assault); August to November 2007
  - PRT-3. 41st Armoured Engineer Battalion; April to September 2007
- TFU-4. 43rd Mechanized Brigade; February to July 2008 under Colonel R. van Harskamp
  - TFE-5. 44th Mechanized Infantry Battalion "Johan Willem Friso"; December 2007 to March 2008
  - TFE-6. 45th Mechanized Infantry Battalion "Oranje Gelderland"; April to July 2008
  - PRT-4. 14th Section Field Artillery; October 2007 to March 2008
- TFU-5. 11th Airmobile Brigade; August 2008 until January 2009 under Colonel C. Matthijssen
  - TFE-7. 11th Infantry Battalion "Garderegiment Grenadiers en Jagers" (Air Assault) Guards Regiment Grenadiers and Rifles; August to November 2008
  - PRT-5. 11th Armored Engineer Battalion; April to September 2008
- TFU-6. 13th Mechanized Brigade; February to July 2009 under Brigadier General T. Middendorp
  - TFE-8. 12th Infantry Battalion (Air Assault); December 2008 to March 2009
  - TFE-9. 11th Tank Battalion Regiment Hussars of Sytzama; April to July 2009
  - PRT-6. 101st CIS battalion; October 2008 to March 2009
- TFU-7. 11th Airmobile Brigade; August 2009 to January 2010 under Brigadier General Marc van Uhm
  - TFE-10. 17th Infantry Battalion "Prinses Irene Fusiliers"; August to November 2009
  - PRT-7. 11 Section Horse Artillery; April to September 2009
- TFU-8. 43rd Mechanized Brigade; February to July 2010 under Brigadier K. van den Heuvel
  - TFE-11. 13th Infantry Regiment Stoottroepen Prins Bernhard (Air Assault); December 2009 to March 2010
  - TFE-12. 42nd Infantry Battalion "Limburgse Jagers" + 13th Infantry Company Marines; April to July 2010
  - PRT-8. 43rd Restoration Company; October 2009 to March 2010
  - PRT-9. 1 CIMIC battalion; April to September 2010
- 2012
  - 3-58th Airfield Operations Battalion, known as TF Guardian
- 2013
  - 4th Battalion, 3rd Aviation Regiment during January 2013

== Australian operations ==
An important item of the overall mission was the Provincial Reconstruction Team (PRT). The PRT was responsible for the supervision of all technical and logistical support to rebuild the Afghan province of Uruzgan. The PRT was part of ISAF and was placed under NATO command.

From their Regional Kandahar Headquarters, Canada, the Netherlands and the United Kingdom took 6-month turns in commanding all NATO military personnel spread over the area.

The Australian 2nd Mentoring and Reconstruction Task Force (MRTF-2) was also based at Camp Holland.

MRTF-2 was engaged in reconstruction, mentoring and security operations in Uruzgan Province.

The bulk of the MRTF was composed of elements from the 3rd Brigade (Australia) (Townsville), with support elements drawn from the 1st Brigade (Australia) (Darwin) and from the Navy and Air Force.

MRTF-2 included 2 Operational Mentoring and Liaison Teams (OMLTs) whose mission was to assist in the development of the 4th Brigade of the Afghan National Army. Australian soldiers that operated in the OMLTs lived with, trained and provided support to their Afghan National Army colleagues in patrol bases in Uruzgan Province. In so doing, the OMLTs continued to develop the capability of the 2nd Afghan Kandak and the 4th Afghan Kandak.

MRTF-2 also included two Combat Teams (CT) which undertook security operations within Uruzgan Province in order to enhance the security environment in the province. These CT's were operationally integrated in the Dutch Battlegroup.

The following units were also here:

- Combined Team Uruzgan
- Force Support Unit
- Force Communication Unit

== See also ==
- July 2005 Afghan captive incident, prisoner abuse case that took place at the base when it was under United States control and known as Forward Operating Base Ripley
- Military history of Australia during the War in Afghanistan
  - Mentoring Task Force One
