= Lewis E. Welshofer Jr. =

CWO3 Lewis E. Welshofer Jr.
- Born: 1964 (age 61–62)
- Military career
- Allegiance: United States of America
- Branch: United States Army
- Rank: Chief Warrant Officer 3
- Conflicts: War in Iraq

Lewis E. Welshofer Jr. is a United States Army soldier, convicted of homicide of an Iraqi prisoner of war on November 23, 2003 in al-Qaim. Welshofer was then serving as a Chief Warrant Officer in the 3d Armored Cavalry Regiment.

Following a technique which he alleged was approved by his superiors, Welshofer placed Iraqi Major General Abed Hamed Mowhoush headfirst into a sleeping bag, wrapped the bag tightly with electrical cords, then sat on his chest and held his mouth closed. General Mowhoush had eight broken ribs from an earlier beating, allegedly carried out by CIA contractors under Welshofer's direction. American forces believed Mowhoush, a former high-level officer in Saddam Hussein's regime, was one of the leaders of the Iraqi insurgency. He had voluntarily surrendered to the Americans in hopes of helping free his sons, who were being held by the Americans.

In his defense, Welshofer had stressed that the General was refusing to acknowledge leading the insurgency, and that his superiors were insisting that Army interrogators "take the gloves off" when dealing with Iraqi prisoners. At his court martial, a CIA official who observed Welshofer's interrogation techniques, wrote a memo because he was alarmed when Welshofer told him that he violated interrogation rules every day.

On January 17, 2006, military judge Mark Toole rejected the request from attorney Frank Spinner, to dismiss the charges. CWO Jefferson L. Williams and Spc Jerry L. Loper both agreed to testify against Welshofer in exchange for a reduction in their own charges relating to the death. Welshofer claimed he was only following orders which came all the way from the Pentagon and Donald Rumsfeld.

Welshofer was ultimately convicted of negligent homicide, and negligent dereliction of duty on January 21, 2006. The jury took 6 hours of deliberation. Welshofer could have faced a dishonorable discharge as well as up to 39 months in prison, but received only 60 days of barracks confinement and he was ordered to forfeit $6,000 in salary. Critics around the world questioned the verdict's leniency.

In September, 2013, in an article looking back on the use of torture in Iraq, Douglas A. Pryer, writing in Foreign Policy magazine, wrote that Welshofer had lobbied for the way he stuffed captives headfirst into sleeping bags be interpreted as an instance of the "extended interrogation technique" Secretary of Defense Donald Rumsfeld had approved -- close confinement.
