= Trial of Anton Cherednik =

2023 trial of a Ukrainian serviceman

- Court: Southern Military District Court, Rostov-on-Don
- Decided: 8 November 2023
- Verdict: Guilty on all counts
- Charge: War crimes; Murder; Cruel treatment of civilians; Forcible seizure of power; Undergoing training for the purpose of carrying out terrorist activities

Court membership
- Judge sitting: Vyacheslav Korsakov

The trial of Anton Cherednik was held in the Russian city of Rostov-on-Don from April until November 2023. Taking place during the Russian invasion of Ukraine, it was the first war crimes trial of the conflict to be held by Russia. Cherednik, a member of the Ukrainian Marine Corps, was accused of murdering a civilian he suspected of being a Russian spy, taking part in terrorist activities and attempting to "forcibly seize power" in the Donetsk People's Republic. Cherednik pleaded guilty to murder on 4 April but denied the other charges. He was found guilty on all counts and sentenced to nineteen years' imprisonment.

== Background ==
The Ukrainian city of Mariupol was besieged by Russian forces during the early stages of the war, and by March 2022 the city had been completely encircled. Anton Cherednik was a sergeant in the 36th Separate Marine Brigade who was stationed in Mariupol during the siege. He was born in the city of Dnipro, and at the time of his trial he was 44 years old.

On 27 March, Cherednik and another soldier were patrolling in the Mirny area of Mariupol when they encountered and stopped two civilians, Oleksandr Piskunov and Sergei Potseluev. Cherednik allegedly fired several rounds from his machine gun at the civilians, forced them to lie on the ground and struck one of them with his weapon. The following events are disputed. According to Potseluev, Cherednik ordered the two men to pronounce the Ukrainian word "palyanitsa" (a shibboleth test sometimes used by the Ukrainian military to identify enemy infiltrators), and when Piskunov was unable to answer correctly, Cherednik shot him. Cherednik initially admitted to this version, which was the version presented by the prosecutor, but later changed his story and claimed that he fired because Piskunov made a sudden gesture and he had believed that Piskunov had a gun. Sergei Potseluev was able to answer correctly and the soldiers released him; he returned hours later to bury Piskunov's body. The body was later recovered by Russian authorities, who performed an autopsy and determined that Piskunov had been shot in the back.

Cherednik was captured by soldiers of the Donetsk People's Republic in April 2022. In a video recorded by Russian investigators on 6 April, he admitted that he murdered a civilian in Mariupol.

== Proceedings ==
Cherednik was charged with war crimes on 13 April 2022. Initially he was scheduled to be tried under the laws of the DPR, but following Russia's annexation of Donetsk in September 2022 his case was reclassified to conform with the Criminal Code of Russia. Under the new indictment, Cherednik was accused of murder, mistreating civilians, forcible seizure of power and training in terrorist activities. The terrorism charges related to his training with the Ukrainian Armed Forces, which Russia considers a terrorist organisation. He was the first Ukrainian soldier to be charged with war crimes during the invasion.

While in pretrial detention, Cherednik was denied access to his family and independent legal representation. The court appointed a lawyer named Vladimir Bakulov to defend him.

At the start of his trial on 4 April 2023, Cherednik pleaded "partly guilty" to the charges, and Bakulov requested a meeting with the judge to explain his client's situation. It later emerged that he had pleaded guilty to Piskunov's murder but still denied the other charges.

The prosecution called eleven witnesses, but only six testified: the soldier who had accompanied Cherednik, Sergei Potseluev, two of Piskunov's relatives, and two local residents who claimed to have witnessed the murder. It was claimed that Cherednik had been motivated by ethnic hatred of Russians, considered an aggravating circumstance that would allow Cherednik to receive a greater sentence. The defence denied this and asked the court to take into account the fact that Cherednik had pleaded guilty and assisted the investigation.

On 8 November 2023, the Southern Military District Court convicted Cherednik on all counts and sentenced him to imprisonment for nineteen years, a sentence even greater than what the prosecution had requested. Cherednik was told he would serve the first three years at a Russian prison and the remainder in a maximum security penal colony. Cherednik's lawyer said his client would appeal the sentence.

Anton Baydrakov, the soldier who had accompanied Cherednik the day of the incident and provided testimony against him, was himself convicted of war crimes in December 2023.
