= Silos camp =

Bosniak-operated concentration camp during the Bosnian War

Silos
- Concentration camp
- A map of the Silos camp within Bosnia and Herzegovina
- Coordinates: 43°48′N 18°06′E
- Location: Tarčin, near Hadžići, Bosnia and Herzegovina
- Operated by: Army of the Republic of Bosnia and Herzegovina
- Original use: Grain silo
- Operational: 1992–1996
- Inmates: Bosnian Serbs and Bosnian Croats
- Number of inmates: 590
- Killed: 24

Silos was a concentration camp operated by the Army of the Republic of Bosnia and Herzegovina (ARBiH) during the Bosnian War. Centered around a windowless grain silo, it was used to detain Bosnian Serb, and to a lesser extent Bosnian Croat, civilians between 1992 and 1996. The camp was located in the village of Tarčin, near the town of Hadžići, 10 kilometres (6.2 mi) west of Sarajevo. Inmates were subjected to beatings, given little food and kept in unsanitary conditions. Five-hundred Bosnian Serb and ninety Bosnian Croat civilians were detained at the camp; twenty-four prisoners lost their lives.

In September 1992, a prisoner exchange was proposed in which the prisoners detained at Silos would be liberated in exchange for the liberation of Bosnian Muslims detained by the Bosnian Serbs. The negotiations eventually broke down and the exchange never took place. After the Red Cross visited Silos in November 1992, conditions improved somewhat. As many as 100 prisoners remained at Silos following the signing of the Dayton Agreement in December 1995, which ended the war. At the urging of U.S. President Bill Clinton, the camp was closed in January 1996, two months after the signing of the Dayton Agreement.

In November 2011, the Bosnian Police arrested eight wartime Bosnian Muslim officials and former camp guards, who were charged with abuses allegedly committed at the camp. In June 2021, seven of the eight were convicted of war crimes and crimes against humanity, and given sentences ranging from five to ten years' imprisonment. One of the defendants died mid-trial before a final verdict could be reached.

== Background ==
An animated map depicting the breakup of Yugoslavia, 1991–1992

Following the death of its longtime leader Josip Broz Tito in 1980, the multi-ethnic socialist state of Yugoslavia entered a period of protracted economic decline. The anemic state of the country's economy led to a substantial increase in ethnic tensions which were only exacerbated by the fall of communism in Eastern Europe in 1989. The following year, the League of Communists of Yugoslavia permitted democratic elections to be held nationwide. In Bosnia and Herzegovina, political parties were established largely along ethnic lines. The Bosnian Muslims founded the Party of Democratic Action (SDA) to represent their interests, the Bosnian Serbs founded the Serb Democratic Party (SDS) and the Bosnian Croats founded the Croatian Democratic Union of Bosnia and Herzegovina (HDZ BiH). The three parties were led by Alija Izetbegović, Radovan Karadžić and Stjepan Kljuić, respectively. Bosnia and Herzegovina held its first democratic election on 18 November 1990. The voting was dominated by nationalist parties such as the SDA, SDS and HDZ BiH. Socialist parties with no ethnic affiliation, most notably the League of Communists of Bosnia and Herzegovina, failed to win a significant percentage of the vote.

The SDA and HDZ BiH, representing the aspirations of most Bosnian Muslims and Bosnian Croats, advocated for Bosnia and Herzegovina's independence from Yugoslavia, a move opposed by the SDS and the vast majority of Bosnian Serbs. On 25 June, the governments of Slovenia and Croatia declared independence from Yugoslavia, leading to the Ten-Day War and the Croatian War of Independence, the first armed conflicts of what would become known as the Yugoslav Wars. In November 1991, the SDS organized a plebiscite, boycotted by Bosnian Muslims and Bosnian Croats, in which the vast majority of Bosnian Serbs voted to remain part of Yugoslavia. The Bosnian government declared the referendum unconstitutional. The following month, an arbitration commission established by the European Economic Community (EEC) declared that a legally binding nationwide independence referendum would be a prerequisite for the EEC's eventual recognition of Bosnia and Herzegovina's independence. The SDS rejected such a referendum as unconstitutional. On 9 January 1992, the SDS announced the establishment of the Serbian Republic of Bosnia and Herzegovina, a self-proclaimed autonomous entity which was to include all the municipalities in which more than 50 percent of voters had voted to remain part of Yugoslavia.

A nationwide independence referendum was held between 29 February and 1 March. At the urging of the SDS, the vast majority of Bosnian Serbs boycotted it. The referendum was reported as having a voter turnout of 63.4 percent, of whom 99.8 percent voted for independence. Since only 63.4 percent of eligible voters had taken part, the referendum failed to attain the two-thirds majority mandated by Bosnia and Herzegovina's constitution. The same day, Izetbegović declared the independence of the Republic of Bosnia and Herzegovina and the Muslim-dominated People's Assembly quickly ratified the decision.

== Operation ==
Tarčin is a predominantly Muslim municipality of Sarajevo, the capital of Bosnia and Herzegovina. During the Bosnian War and the concurrent Siege of Sarajevo (1992–1996), it was an area of great strategic significance because it connected the besieged city with the remaining territory controlled by the Army of the Republic of Bosnia and Herzegovina (ARBiH). Fearful of a fifth column that would threaten their rear, the local authorities arrested all Bosnian Serb males of fighting age and detained them inside a large, windowless grain silo in Tarčin. Tarčin was home to another detention facility operated by the ARBiH, a health clinic that was located about 200 metres (660 ft) from the Silos camp. Some of those who were detained at the clinic were reportedly later transferred to Silos.

The grain silo contained eleven compartments, 25 square metres (270 sq ft) to 35 square metres (380 sq ft) each. Between each compartment were walls about 4 metres (13 ft) high, and between 0.5 metres (1 ft 8 in) and 1 metre (3 ft 3 in) wide. The space between compartments was patrolled by camp guards, who referred to each other exclusively by their surnames. The first detainees were brought to Silos in mid-May 1992. These initial forcible detentions lasted until June. According to survivors, inmates ranged between the ages of 14 and 80. Among those arrested was Slavko Jovičić, a future deputy in the Parliamentary Assembly of Bosnia and Herzegovina, as well as at least two Bosnian Serbs who had fought with the ARBiH. (Note: According to one survivor, in one instance, prisoners were first taken to a government building in Tarčin and ordered to face a wall. "People started screaming Allahu Akbar and they started beating us ... When the group got tired of beating us, others stepped into their place. That lasted two or three hours, and then they took us to the Silos camp." Other inmates were transferred to Silos after being detained at the 9th of May primary school in the village of Pazarić. One survivor, who had been detained for ten days at the school before being relocated to Silos, recalled, "they ordered us to kneel and bow in prayer and they kicked us while we were doing it.") Prisoners did not see daylight for months at a time; some died of starvation. (Note: "We got one bowl of stew for seven or eight prisoners," one survivor recalled. "It smelled of urine ... One of us took a spoon, then another, we would go in circles. Sometimes you got one spoonful of food, sometimes two or three.") One survivor reported having lost 50 kilograms (110 lb) during his detention. The camp contained no sanitary facilities or running water and was surrounded by barbed wire. Inmates slept on the concrete floor. Some inmates died of disease. Many fell ill as the silo floor became covered with human excrement; others were killed by gunfire and artillery while labouring on the frontlines on their captors' orders. The camp was capable of holding 600 inmates at full capacity.

In September 1992, a prisoner exchange involving 454 Bosnian Muslim and 463 Bosnian Serb detainees was attempted. It was envisaged that the Army of Republika Srpska (VRS) would release Bosnian Muslim inmates from a prison in the village of Kula, near Sokolac, and the ARBiH would release the inmates detained at Silos. Negotiations eventually broke down and the exchange never took place. After the Red Cross visited Silos in November 1992, conditions improved somewhat. Between 15 and 17 April 1993, the ARBiH wrested the town of Konjic from the Croatian Defence Council, taking more than 1,000 Bosnian Croats prisoner, some of whom were detained at Silos. On 13 June 1993, multiple Bosnian Croat males from Tarčin were detained by the ARBiH and imprisoned at Silos.

More than 100 inmates remained captive after the signing of the Dayton Accords in December 1995, which ended the Bosnian War. Through an intermediary, California congressman Ron Dellums, the American Serbian Women's Caucus in San Francisco successfully lobbied U.S. President Bill Clinton to call for the release of all the remaining inmates. Clinton subsequently told Izetbegović that all Bosnian Serb detainees had to be freed. Following the camp's dissolution, the Bosnian Serbs released many of the hostages they had taken to ensure the Silos inmates' safety. Among these was a Bosnian Muslim women in her fifties, who in February 1993, had been taken hostage by an elderly Bosnian Serb woman whose daughter had been imprisoned at Silos. The Bosnian Muslim woman was set free on 24 January 1996, having languished in the basement of her captor's family home for almost three years. Over the course of its existence, 24 inmates died or were killed at Silos.

== Aftermath ==
=== Legal proceedings ===
On 22 November 2011, the Bosnian Police arrested Fadil and Halid Čović, Mustafa Đelilović, Bećir Hujić, Nermin Kalember, Nezir Kazić, Šerif Mešanović and Mirsad Šabić on suspicion of war crimes and crimes against humanity committed at the Silos camp, as well as two other sites in the Tarčin municipality. During the war, Đelilović had been the president of the municipality of Tarčin, president of the municipal assembly and the president of the municipality's Crisis Committee. Fadil Čović had been the municipality's police chief. Kazić had been the commander of the ARBiH's 9th Mountain Brigade. Hujić had served as the commander of the Silos camp; Halid Čović and Mešanović were his deputies. Kalember had worked as a guard at Silos and Šabić had served as a police officer. The Sarajevo Canton Assembly voted unanimously to condemn the arrests, deploring that the suspects had been apprehended "as if they were criminals in hiding". The assembly also voted to authorize the canton's Ministry of Veteran Affairs to provide the defendants with "legal, financial and material assistance". The motion passed almost unanimously. Only two deputies, Our Party (Bosnian: Naša stranka) members Predrag Kojović and Danis Tanović, abstained. Mustafa Cerić, then the Grand Mufti of Bosnia and Herzegovina, also condemned the indictments and called for a "Muslim awakening" in response. On 21 February 2012, seven of the eight indictees pleaded not guilty on all counts. Kazić stated that he would enter a plea after consulting with his lawyer, remarking that he did not understand the charges. On 1 March, he also pleaded not guilty.

On 5 July 2018, in a first-instance verdict, all eight defendants were found guilty of illegally detaining civilians and holding them in unbearable living conditions. The eight were acquitted of committing crimes against prisoners of war, as the court found that all the detainees had been civilians. The trial had lasted more than six years. Đelilović and Kazić were sentenced to ten years in prison. Fadil Čović and Hujić were sentenced to eight years in prison. Šabić and Halid Čović were sentenced to six years in prison. Mešanović and Kalember were both sentenced to five years. Đelilović and Halid Čović's lawyers appealed the verdict. On 15 July 2019, the appeals chamber of the Court of Bosnia and Herzegovina overturned the convictions and ordered a retrial.

The retrial commenced on 17 September 2019. The proceedings against Mešanović were subsequently separated from that of the other defendants on account of Mešanović's poor health. Đelilović died mid-trial on 9 March 2021. The municipality of Hadžići declared a day of mourning following his death. On 10 June 2021, the Court of Bosnia and Herzegovina upheld the first-instance verdicts of all six remaining defendants except Halid Čović, whose sentence was reduced to five years. In its ruling, the court upheld that 500 Bosnian Serb and 90 Bosnian Croat civilians had been detained at Silos. The verdicts cannot be appealed; the time the defendants spent imprisoned was calculated toward their sentences. Mešanović's verdict was scheduled to be delivered the following day. On 11 June, the court once again found Mešanović guilty and increased his sentence to six years' imprisonment.

=== Legacy ===
In November 2012, the judges presiding over Karadžić's trial at the International Criminal Tribunal for the former Yugoslavia in The Hague dismissed the testimony of camp survivor Radojka Pandurević on the grounds that it did not pertain directly to the charges against Karadžić. (Note: Pandurević had written a nine-page statement which she intended to submit as evidence. The judges ruled that much of her statement, especially the passages pertaining to her experiences at Silos, were "irrelevant – and thus inadmissible". Although her statement was admitted as evidence, the passages pertaining to Silos – representing around one-third of her statement – were blacked out.) Pandurević had been summoned to appear as a defence witness by Karadžić. The following year, the legal scholar Janine Natalya Clark interviewed Pandurević, who had been detained at Silos for 1,339 days. "[My] time at the ICTY was worse than [my] time in the camp," the woman told Clark. She also stated that the experience further reinforced her belief that "the Tribunal has no interest in hearing about crimes against Serbs." Clark noted that most of the local Bosniaks she interviewed denied having any knowledge of the camp and invariably redirected the conversation towards atrocities committed by the Bosnian Serbs.

In 2013, camp survivor Đorđo Šuvajlo published a memoir titled 1,135 Days (Serbian: 1.135 dana), recounting his experiences at Silos. An English-language translation of the memoir was published in 2017.
