= Crimes Against Humanity and War Crimes Act =

Statute of the parliament of Canada

Parliament of Canada
- Long title: An Act respecting genocide, crimes against humanity and war crimes and to implement the Rome Statute of the International Criminal Court, and to make consequential amendments to other Acts
- Citation: S.C. 2000, c. 24
- Enacted by: Parliament of Canada
- Assented to: 29 June 2000
- Commenced: 23 October 2000
- Bill citation: Bill C-19, 36th Parliament, 2nd Session
- Introduced by: The Hon. Lloyd Axworthy, Minister of Foreign Affairs

Repeals
- ss. 9, 27, 28, 29, 31 repealed by S.C. 2001, c. 32, s. 59; s. 43 repealed by S.C. 2001, c. 34.

The Crimes Against Humanity and War Crimes Act (French: Loi sur les crimes contre l’humanité et les crimes de guerre, CAHWCA) is a statute of the Parliament of Canada. The Act implements Canada's obligations under the Rome Statute of the International Criminal Court. In passing the Crimes Against Humanity and War Crimes Act on 24 June 2000 and having royal assent given on 29 June 2000, Canada became the first country in the world to incorporate the obligations of the Rome Statute into its domestic laws. It replaced earlier 1987 legislation targeting Nazi war criminals passed in the immediate wake of the Deschênes Commission.

== Content ==
The Crimes Against Humanity and War Crimes Act (CAHWCA) allows for the investigation and prosecution of three international crimes: war crimes, genocide, and crimes against humanity. While these crimes share some similarities, they each have distinct elements that set them apart from one another, as well as from regular domestic crimes such as murder defined in the Criminal Code. Additionally, the CAHWCA provides for the prosecution of military commanders or civilian superiors who breach their responsibilities.

Genocide is defined legally under the Crimes Against Humanity and War Crimes Act. It refers to acts like murder, sexual violence, or forcibly transferring children with the specific intent to destroy, either wholly or partially, a national, ethnic, racial, or religious group. The targeted group must be identifiable and stable, such as an ethnic or religious group. What sets genocide apart from other crimes is the specific intent to eradicate the existence of the group.

Crimes against humanity are also defined in the Crimes Against Humanity and War Crimes Act. They do not require specific intent or the presence of armed conflict and can occur during times of peace. This crime involves prohibited acts carried out as part of a widespread or systematic attack against any civilian population. While the attack can be either widespread or systematic, both are often seen in practice. The CAHWCA lists ten specific acts that may constitute a crime against humanity, such as murder and persecution. The category of other inhumane acts includes actions of comparable gravity to those that are specifically listed.

War crimes are defined in the Crimes Against Humanity and War Crimes Act and involve specific prohibited acts committed during armed conflict, whether international or non-international. These acts must have a sufficient connection to the conflict. Various acts aim to protect civilians and prisoners of war, and specific weapon use and methods of warfare can also constitute war crimes.

The CAHWCA also addresses breach of responsibility by military commanders or superiors. This crime applies when someone in a position of authority fails to prevent or punish subordinates who commit genocide, crimes against humanity, or war crimes.

Crime against humanity refers to actions like murder, extermination, enslavement, deportation, imprisonment, torture, sexual violence, and persecution against civilians or identifiable groups. These acts are recognized as crimes under international law, regardless of local laws.

== Utilization ==
In 2019, Canada's National Inquiry into Missing and Murdered Indigenous Women argued that when it comes to state responsibility for genocide, "a state's specific intent to destroy a protected group can only be proved by the existence of a genocidal policy or manifest pattern of conduct." The MMIWG inquiry used a broader definition of genocide from the Crimes Against Humanity and War Crimes Act which encompasses "not only acts of commission, but 'omission' as well." The inquiry described the traditional legal definition of genocide as "narrow" and based on the Holocaust.

== Trials ==
On 19 October 2005, Désiré Munyaneza, a Rwandan immigrant living in Toronto, became the first person arrested and charged with an offence under the CAHWCA. Munyaneza was charged with two counts of genocide, two counts of crimes against humanity, and three counts of war crimes for actions allegedly committed in Rwanda in 1994.

On 22 May 2009, Munyaneza was convicted of all charges and is the first person to have been convicted under the CAHWCA. On 29 October 2009, Munyaneza was sentenced to life in prison with no chance of parole for 25 years. On 7 May 2014, the Quebec Court of Appeal unanimously dismissed his appeal, thereby affirming his conviction. On 18 December 2014, the Supreme Court of Canada denied his motion for leave to appeal, thus definitively cementing the guilty verdict.

A second Rwandan, Jacques Mungwarere, was charged with "an act of genocide" under the Act on 7 November 2009. The Royal Canadian Mounted Police alleged that he committed this act in the western Rwandan city of Kibuye, and that his case is connected to that of Munyaneza. Mungwarere has claimed that the accusations made against him were fabricated. On 5 July 2013, Mungwarere was acquitted by Judge Michel Charbonneau of the Ontario Superior Court of Justice.
