= Blagoje Simić =

Blagoje Simić (born 1 July 1960) is a Bosnian Serb former politician, member of the Serb War Presidency, sentenced by the International Criminal Tribunal for the former Yugoslavia (ICTY) for war crimes during the Bosnian War.

Born in Bosanski Šamac, then Yugoslavia, he completed medical school in Tuzla in 1984 and in that same year started to work as a physician at the Medical Centre in Bosanski Šamac. In 1991 he obtained his residency in the field of internal medicine, which he then changed to epidemiology due to the war necessities. He became a member of the Serbian Democratic Party (SDS) in the summer of 1990, and was the President of SDS Municipal Board in Bosanski Šamac from 1991 to 1995. He was heading the SDS list in the elections of 1990. He was the president of the Assembly of SAO Northern Bosnia from 4 November to 30 November 1991. He was vice-chairman of the Municipal Assembly from 1991 through 17 April 1992.

== War crimes and indictment ==
The Prosecution of the ICTY alleged that on 17 April 1992, Serb military forces from Bosnia and Herzegovina and elsewhere in the former Yugoslavia seized control of the town of Bosanski Šamac by force, and within a few days controlled the entire Municipality of Bosanski Šamac. The Serbs then announced that the government of the Municipality of Bosanski Šamac had been replaced by the "Serbian Municipality of Bosanski Šamac". Immediately after the forcible takeover, Serb authorities established the "Serbian Municipality of Bosanski Šamac Crisis Staff", which took the place of the duly-elected municipal assembly and controlled all aspects of the municipal government. The Serb authorities then unlawfully arrested and detained Bosnian Croats, Bosnian Muslims, and other non-Serb civilians; forced many non-Serb residents to leave their homes, and transferred many to other villages where they were detained against their will; expelled and deported them; and required many to participate in forced labour projects and the wide-scale looting of private and commercial property belonging to non-Serbs.

The Prosecution highlighted that on or about 17 April 1992 to at least 31 December 1993 Blagoje Simić was appointed President of the Bosanski Šamac Crisis Staff, which was renamed the War Presidency on or about 21 July 1992. In these positions he was responsible for issuing orders, policies, decisions and other regulations in the name of the Crisis Staff and War Presidency. It is also alleged that from 1991 to 1995 he was President of the Serbian Democratic Party (SDS) in Bosanski Šamac; from 1991 to 17 April 1992, Vice-Chairman of the Municipal Assembly; and from 4 November 1991 to at least 30 November 1992, Deputy of the Assembly of the self-declared "Serb Autonomous Region of Northern Bosnia", later called the "Serb Autonomous Province of Semberija and Majevica". On or about 22 January 1993 he was elected President of the "Šamac Municipal Assembly" and served in this position until after the announcement of the First Indictment of the ICTY. He was the highest ranking civilian official in the municipality of Bosanski Šamac.

The Prosecution expressed that from about 17 April 1992 to at least 31 December 1992, Blagoje Simić, both prior to, and while serving as President of the Bosanski Šamac Crisis Staff, and as President of the War Presidency, acting in concert with others, planned, instigated, ordered, committed, or otherwise aided and abetted the planning, preparation, or execution of the crime of persecutions. He was additionally charged with persecutions as a crime against humanity, through his participation in the issuance of orders, policies, decisions and other regulations in the name of the Crisis Staff and War Presidency and the authorisation of other official actions which violated the rights of the Bosnian Croats, Bosnian Muslims and other non-Serb civilians to equal treatment under the law and infringed upon their enjoyment of basic and fundamental rights.

Blagoje Simić surrendered voluntarily on 12 March 2001 and was transferred on the same day to the ICTY.

== Judgement and conviction ==
A conviction is entered for the crime against humanity for persecutions based upon unlawful arrest and detention of Bosnian Muslim and Bosnian Croat civilians, cruel and inhumane treatment including beatings, torture, forced labour assignments, and confinement under inhumane conditions, and deportation and forcible transfer.

The Trial Chamber of the ICTY by a majority, Judge Per-Johan Lindholm dissenting, sentenced Blagoje Simić to a sentence of imprisonment for 17 years.

Blagoje Simić lodged an appeal against this judgement. On 28 November 2006, the Appeals Chamber of the ICTY reduced his sentence to 15 years imprisonment.

On 27 March 2007, Simić was transferred to the United Kingdom to serve his sentence.
