= Carmen Mory =

Swiss Nazi German spy and kapo in the Ravensbrück concentration camp

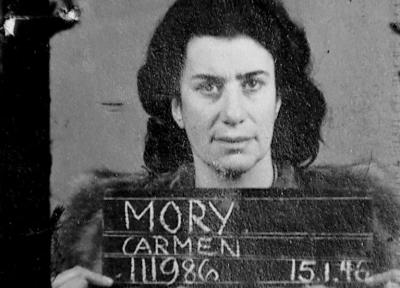
- Mory in a 1946 mugshot
- Born: 2 July 1906; Bern, Switzerland
- Died: 9 April 1947 (aged 40); Hamburg, Allied-occupied Germany
- Cause of death: Suicide
- Status: Deceased
- Motive: Nazism; Sadism
- Convictions: France; Espionage; British Military; War crimes
- Trial: Hamburg Ravensbrück trials
- Penalty: France; Death; British Military; Death
- Occupations: Journalist; Spy
- Espionage activity
- Allegiance: Germany
- Service branch: Gestapo
- Service years: 1934–1938

Carmen Castro Mory (2 July 1906 – 9 April 1947) was a Swiss spy for Nazi Germany and Kapo in the Ravensbrück concentration camp. She was sentenced to death in the Hamburg Ravensbrück trials in 1947.

== Early life and career ==
Carmen Castro Mory was born 2 July 1906 in Bern, Switzerland to Dr. Ernest Emil Mory, a Swiss physician in charge of the sanatorium in Switzerland and Leona Castro Bischoff, a Filipino from Iloilo, Philippines. Before the war, she worked as a journalist, including for the Manchester Guardian (now The Guardian). From 1932 to 1937 she worked as a journalist in Berlin, where in 1934 she became an undercover agent for the Gestapo, working under Bruno Sattler. In 1937 she was assigned to observe publisher Emil Oprecht in Zurich and later that year, politician Max Braun in Paris. She also collected information on the Maginot Line.

== Arrests and releases ==
In November 1938 she was arrested in France and on 28 April 1940, sentenced to death. She was pardoned on 6 June 1940; according to some sources because she offered to become a double spy for the French. Shortly afterward, Germany successfully completed its invasion of France. Having lost the trust of her superiors in the Gestapo, she was then arrested by German authorities, released, arrested again in 1941 and sent to Ravensbrück concentration camp where she became a head of the bloc (kapo). Despite being a kapo, she was scheduled to be sent to the gas chamber, but a friend of her father (a Bern doctor) struck her name off the list.

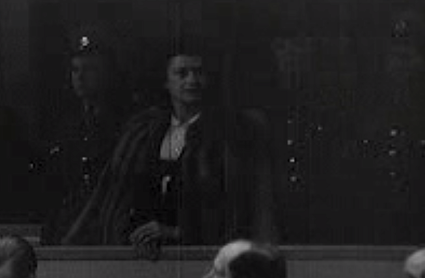
Carmen Mory (1906–1947), 1st Ravensbrück Trial 1947: The Sentencing

In Ravensbrück she acquired a "monstrous" reputation, with one source describing her as "sadomasochistic, psychopathic, sexually voracious [and] one of the camp's most notorious kapos". She also had a close relationship with Anne Spoerry.

== Later life, arrest, and suicide ==
After the end of the war, she was released from the camp. After being identified by other inmates for her actions in Ravensbrück, she was arrested by the Allied authorities and sentenced to death in the Hamburg Ravensbrück trials in 1947; she committed suicide by slashing her wrists before the execution could take place. She received significant negative coverage in press during her trial, having been described as "the monster", a "third-rate Mata Hari", and "Bella Donna".
