= Nicholas Ribic =

Canadian hostage taker (born 1974)

- Born: 1974 (age 51–52); Edmonton, Alberta, Canada
- Allegiance: Republika Srpska
- Service years: 1992–1995
- Rank: Soldier

Nicholas "Nick" Ribic (born 1974) is a Canadian who fought in the Bosnian Serb Army where he was also known as Nikola Ribić. In 1995, he took four United Nations peacekeepers hostage and used them as a human shield to try to force a halt to the ongoing bombing of Serb-held territories in Bosnia by NATO forces.

He was the first Canadian to be prosecuted for a hostage-taking committed outside the country. Ribic was charged under a section of the Criminal Code of Canada on jurisdiction that had never been used before that allows Canada to claim jurisdiction over kidnapping and hostage-taking offences outside of the country when a Canadian perpetrator or victim is involved.

Ribic's hostage was a fellow Canadian, Capt. Patrick Rechner, working in Bosnia as an unarmed U.N. military observer. The May 1995 worldwide television and newspaper coverage showed the photo of Capt. Rechner chained to a lightning rod at an ammunition bunker in the Bosnian Serb stronghold of Pale. Ribic was in the uniform of a Bosnian Serb soldier, wielding an AK47 rifle, in the company of other Serb soldiers. Held for 24 days, the photo of Capt. Rechner became a symbol of the United Nations' incapacity to deal with Serb military offensives.

== Hostage taking ==
Ribic travelled to Republika Srpska in 1992, ostensibly because he "want[ed] to fight Muslims". There he joined the Bosnian Serb Army as a volunteer. On May 24, 1995, British General Rupert Smith, leading a United Nations contingent, warned both the Bosnian Muslims and the Bosnian Serbs in Pale to cease street fighting and shelling, or risk an air strike from NATO aircraft. The Serbian faction ignored the warning and was hit by a retaliatory airstrike which dropped two bombs on their base ten kilometres south of the city the next day.

The day after the bombs were dropped, it is alleged that Ribic and other Bosnian Serbs walked into the United Nations office with AK-47s and took several staff members hostage, including Russians Capt. Zidlik and Capt. Pavel Teterevsk, and Canadian Capt. Patrick Rechner. They demanded that Major Guy Lavender phone Smith, and subsequently warned the General that bombing of Serb targets had to cease or the hostages would be killed.

The hostages were taken to the Serbian base south of the city, where Rechner was handcuffed to a lightning rod outside a warehouse being used to store mortar rounds. Ribic then allegedly phoned the United Nations and warned that "The three UN observers are at the site of the warehouse. Any more bombings, they'll be the first to go." The prisoners were noted to have been "treated well" during their confinement, and were voluntarily returned to the United Nations office on June 18.

== Arrest and subsequent trials ==
In 2000, the Royal Canadian Mounted Police traced Ribic down to his new home in Germany, and he was arrested in February. Nine months later, he was extradited to face charges in Canada, where he was defended by lawyer D'Arcy DePoe.

Ribic's trial began in Ottawa, Ontario on October 8, 2002. The trial however unraveled three months later when judge Douglas Cunningham of the Supreme Court of Ontario declared a mistrial on 20 January 2003, after only nine days of testimony.

Ribic was retried in 2005 for hostage taking and allegedly threatening death. His lawyer, D'Arcy DePoe, called it "one of the most unusual criminal trials in Canadian history" as it was the first time a Canadian had been tried in this manner. "While this is an unusual form of trespass, it is submitted that NATO dropping 2,000-pound bombs on this property was clearly a trespass."

This time, there was no mistrial declared and Ribic was convicted and found guilty of hostage taking and threatening death and sentenced to three years in prison. Two witnesses from the Canadian Armed Forces, known only as Witness A and Witness B, were only allowed to testify by transcript during Ribic's 2005 trial.

In 2008, Ribic appealed the decision to the Ontario Court of Appeal. Ribic's attorney DePoe objected to the fact that the two witnesses from the Canadian Armed Forces were only allowed to testify by transcript.

The court rejected Ribic's appeal, concluding that Ribic had no connection to the ammunition bunkers that entitled him to defend them from trespassing and that the trial judge's handling of Witness A and Witness B was acceptable.
