= Désiré Munyaneza =

Rwandan war criminal (born 1966)

- Born: December 1966 (age 59); Rwanda
- Status: Incarcerated
- Convictions: Genocide (2 counts); Crimes against humanity (2 counts); War crimes (3 counts)
- Penalty: Life imprisonment without the possibility of parole for 25 years

Désiré Munyaneza (born 1966) is a Rwandan convicted war criminal imprisoned in Canada. Before his arrest he was a businessman living in Toronto, Ontario. He arrived in Canada in 1997 using a fake Cameroonian passport. He is the first person to be arrested and convicted in Canada on charges of war crimes and crimes against humanity, for his role in the 1994 Rwandan genocide. He was sent to jail in October 2009.

== Arrest ==
On October 19, 2005, the Royal Canadian Mounted Police announced it had detained Munyaneza under the Crimes Against Humanity and War Crimes Act with charges for two counts of genocide, two counts of crimes against humanity and three counts of war crimes.

Munyaneza was the first person to be arrested under that law, which was passed to give formal recognition to Canada's obligations to the International Criminal Court.

Munyaneza committed the acts near Butare, Rwanda in 1994.

== Trial ==
Munyaneza's trial began in March 2007 with the testimony of a woman, identified only as witness C-15, who stated that she had pretended to be dead for three days and smeared her sister's blood on her body to hide from Interahamwe gangs.

On April 10, a witness known as C-17 testified that Munyaneza had raped her four times, and that she had witnessed him personally raping and killing others.

On April 11, Munyaneza was severely beaten in his cell at the Rivières-des-Prairies prison by a 17-year-old who had heard about the details of Munyaneza's trial in the media.

On May 22, 2009, Munyaneza, 42 years old, was convicted on seven counts related to genocide, war crimes and crimes against humanity. The offences fall under Canada's Crimes Against Humanity and War Crimes Act, which allows residents to be tried for crimes committed abroad. Munyaneza is the first person to be convicted under the Canadian law. The trial, held in Montreal with the court also travelling to Rwanda, saw sixty-six people testify in court. Many had their identities hidden.

== Sentence ==
On October 29, 2009, Munyaneza was sentenced to life in prison with no chance of parole for 25 years. Canadian law stated that Munyaneza's criminal activities were the "worst in existence". The judge referred to the sentence as "severe". It is anticipated that Munyaneza will appeal the sentence. Munyaneza's lawyer thought he should be imprisoned for just twenty years. Emmanuel Muhawenimena, who said he lost 70 family members in the genocide, said "So many Rwandans in Montreal, across Canada, all over the world, they are happy today."
