= Prijedor ethnic cleansing =

Ethnic cleansing during the Bosnian War

Prijedor massacre
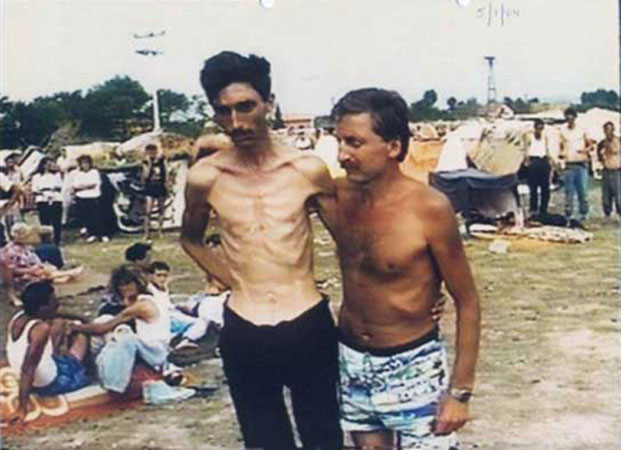
- A photo from the Trnopolje concentration camp near Prijedor
- Location: 44°58′51″N 16°42′48″E; Prijedor, Bosnia and Herzegovina
- Date: 30 April 1992–c.1993
- Target: Bosniaks and Bosnian Croats
- Attack type: mass murder, ethnic cleansing, population transfer
- Deaths: over 3,500
- Perpetrator: Bosnian Serb forces
- Motive: Anti-Bosniak sentiment, anti-Croat sentiment, Serbianisation, Greater Serbia

During the Bosnian War, there was an ethnic cleansing campaign committed by the Bosnian Serb political and military leadership – Army of the Republika Srpska, mostly against Bosniak and Croat civilians in the Prijedor region of Bosnia and Herzegovina in 1992 and 1993. The composition of non-Serbs was drastically reduced: out of a population of 50,000 Bosniaks and 6,000 Croats, only some 6,000 Bosniaks and 3,000 Croats remained in the municipality by the end of the war. Apart from the Srebrenica massacre, Prijedor is the area with the highest rate of civilian killings committed during the Bosnian War. According to the Sarajevo-based Research and Documentation Center (IDC), 4,868 people were killed or went missing in the Prijedor municipality during the war. Among them were 3,515 Bosniak civilians, 186 Croat civilians and 78 Serb civilians. As of October 2013, 96 mass graves have been located and around 2,100 victims have been identified, largely by DNA analysis.

The International Criminal Tribunal for the Former Yugoslavia (ICTY) sentenced 20 people in relation to crimes perpetrated in Prijedor, finding them guilty of persecutions on political, racial or religious grounds; murder; inhumane acts; extermination; deportation or forced displacement (crimes against humanity), and wanton destruction of cities, towns or villages or devastation not justified by military necessity; destruction or wilful damage done to institutions dedicated to religion (violations of the laws or customs of war).

== History ==
The crimes committed in Prijedor have been subjected to 13 trials before the International Criminal Tribunal for the Former Yugoslavia. Politicians, soldiers and police officers in the Serb SDS and crisis staff, including Milomir Stakić, Milan Kovačević, Radoslav Brđanin, ranging to the highest leaders including general Ratko Mladić, Bosnian Serb president Radovan Karadžić, and Serbian president Slobodan Milošević have been charged with genocide, persecution, deportation, extermination, murder, forced transfers, and unlawful confinement, torture as crimes against humanity (widespread, systematic attacks against a civilian population) and other crimes, have been alleged to have occurred in Prijedor. The ICTY has characterized the Prijedor events of 1992 as having met the "actus reus" (guilty act) of genocide through killing members of the group and causing serious bodily and mental harm to members of the group. However, the requirement of the specific intent to physically destroy was not established beyond reasonable doubt. However, the events of 1992 in Prijedor were part of the larger joint criminal enterprise to forcibly remove Bosnian Muslims and Croats from large territories of Bosnia. In 2013, investigators were led by two Bosnian Serb civilians who worked in and around the camps to a mining complex Ljubija, unearthing the largest mass grave in Bosnian war, and the discovery of over 1,000 bodies in both the Tomašica and Jakarina Kosa mine mass grave sites.

== Background ==
Following Slovenia's and Croatia's declarations of independence in June 1991, the situation in the Prijedor municipality rapidly deteriorated. During the war in Croatia, the tension increased between the Serbs and the communities of Bosniaks and Croats.

Bosniaks and Croats began to leave the municipality because of a growing sense of insecurity and fear caused by intensifying Serb propaganda. The municipal newspaper Kozarski Vjesnik started publishing allegations against the non-Serbs. The Serb media propagandised the idea that the Serbs had to arm themselves. Terms like Ustasha (Ustaše), Mujahideen (Mudžahedini) and Green Berets (Zelene beretke) were used widely in the press as synonyms for the non-Serb population. Radio Prijedor disseminated propaganda insulting Croats and Bosnian Muslims. As one result of the takeover of the transmitter station on Mount Kozara in August 1991 by the Serbian paramilitary unit the Wolves of Vučjak, TV Sarajevo was cut off. It was replaced by broadcasts from Belgrade and Banja Luka with interviews of radical Serb politicians and renditions of Serb nationalist songs, which would previously have been banned.

== Political developments before the takeover ==
On 7 January 1992, the Serb members of the Prijedor Municipal Assembly and the presidents of the local Municipal Boards of the Serbian Democratic Party proclaimed the Assembly of the Serbian People of the Municipality of Prijedor and implemented secret instructions that were issued earlier on 19 December 1991. The "Organisation and Activity of Organs of the Serbian People in Bosnia and Herzegovina in Extraordinary Circumstances" provided a plan for the SDS take-over of municipalities in BiH, it also included plans for the creation of Crisis Staffs. Milomir Stakić, later convicted by ICTY of mass crimes against humanity against Bosniak and Croat civilians, was elected President of this Assembly. Ten days later, on 17 January 1992, the Assembly endorsed joining the Serbian territories of the Municipality of Prijedor to the Autonomous Region of Bosnian Krajina in order to implement creation of a separate Serbian state on ethnic Serbian territories.

On 23 April 1992, the Serbian Democratic Party decided inter alia that all Serb units immediately start working on the takeover of the municipality in co-ordination with the Yugoslav People's Army and units of the future Army of the Republika Srpska). By the end of April 1992, a number of clandestine Serb police stations were created in the municipality and more than 1,500 armed Serbs were ready to take part in the takeover.

== Takeover ==
A declaration on the takeover prepared by the Serb politicians from the Serbian Democratic Party was read out on Radio Prijedor the day after the takeover and was repeated throughout the day. When planning the anticipated takeover, it was decided that the 400 Serb policemen who would be involved in the takeover would be sufficient for the task. The objective of the takeover was to take over the functions of the president of the municipality, the vice-president of the municipality, the director of the post office, the chief of the police etc.

During the night of 29/30 April 1992, the takeover of power took place. Employees of the public security station and reserve police gathered in Čirkin Polje, part of the town of Prijedor. Only Serbs were present and some of them were wearing military uniforms. The people there were given the task of taking over power in the municipality and were broadly divided into five groups. Each group of about twenty had a leader and each was ordered to gain control of certain buildings. One group was responsible for the Assembly building, one for the main police building, one for the courts, one for the bank and the last for the post-office.

The ICTY concluded that the takeover by the Serb politicians was an illegal coup d'état, which was planned and coordinated a long time in advance with the ultimate aim of creating a pure Serbian municipality. These plans were never hidden and they were implemented in a coordinated action by the Serb police, army and politicians. One of the leading figures was Milomir Stakić, who came to play the dominant role in the political life of the Municipality.

== Armed attacks against the civilians ==
After the takeover, civilian life was transformed in a myriad of ways. Tension and fear increased significantly among the non-Serb population in Prijedor municipality. There was a marked increase in the military presence of Serb formations in the town of Prijedor. Armed soldiers were placed on top of all the high rise buildings in Prijedor town and the Serb police established checkpoints throughout the town of Prijedor.

In the Stakić case, the ICTY concluded that many people were killed during the attacks by the Serb army on predominantly Bosnian Muslim villages and towns throughout the Prijedor municipality and several massacres of Bosnian Muslims took place and that a comprehensive pattern of atrocities against Bosnian Muslims in Prijedor municipality in 1992 had been proved beyond reasonable doubt.

=== Propaganda ===
After the takeover, Radio Prijedor propagated Serb nationalist ideas characterising prominent non-Serbs as criminals and extremists, who should be punished for their behaviour. One example of such propaganda was the derogatory language used for referring to non-Serbs such as Mujahideen, Ustaše or Green Berets. Both the print and broadcast media also spread what can be only considered as blatant lies according to the ICTY conclusion about non-Serb doctors: Dr. Mirsad Mujadžić of the Bosniak ethnic group was accused of injecting drugs into Serb women making them incapable of giving birth to male children and Dr. Željko Sikora, a Croat, referred to as the Monster Doctor, was accused of making Serb women abort if they were pregnant with male children and of castrating the male babies of Serbian parents. Moreover, in a "Kozarski Vjesnik" article dated 10 June 1992, Dr. Osman Mahmuljin was accused of deliberately having provided incorrect medical care to his Serb colleague Dr. Živko Dukić, who had a heart attack. Dr. Dukić's life was saved only because Dr. Radojka Elenkov discontinued the therapy allegedly initiated by Dr. Mahmuljin. The appeals were broadcast aimed at the Serbs to lynch the non-Serbs. Moreover, forged biographies of prominent non-Serbs, including Prof. Muhamed Čehajić, Mr. Crnalić, Dr. Eso Sadiković and Dr. Osman Mahmuljin, were broadcast. According to ICTY conclusion in Stakić verdict Mile Mutić, the director of Kozarski Vjesnik and the journalist Rade Mutić regularly attended meetings of Serb politicians (local authorities) in order to get informed about next steps of spreading propaganda.

=== Strengthening of Serb forces ===
In the weeks following the takeover, the Serb authorities in Prijedor worked to strengthen their position militarily in accordance with decisions adopted on the highest levels. On 12 May 1992, the self-appointed Assembly of the Serbian People established the Serbian Army under Ratko Mladić’s command by bringing together former JNA (later Army of Serbia and Montenegro and Army of Republika Srpska) units.

Major Radmilo Željaja issued an ultimatum calling for all Bosniak citizens to hand over their weapons to the Serbian Army and to declare their loyalty to the Serbian Republic and to respond to the mobilisation call-ups. The ultimatum issued also contained a threat that any resistance would be punished. For the most part, the civilian population complied with these requests turning in their hunting rifles and pistols as well as their permits and in the belief that if they handed in their weapons they would be safe. House searches performed by soldiers of the homes of the non-Serb population were common and any weapons found were confiscated.

=== Marking of non-Serb houses and people ===
Many non-Serbs were dismissed from their jobs in the period after the takeover. The general tendency is reflected in a decision of the Serb regional authorities i.e. Crisis Staff of the Autonomous Region of Krajina (ARK) dated 22 June 1992, which provides that all socially-owned enterprises, joint-stock companies, state institutions, public utilities, Ministries of the Interior, and the Army of the Serbian Republic may only be held by personnel of Serbian nationality.

The announcements broadcast on the radio, from 31 May 1992 onward, also obliged non-Serbs to hang white bed sheets outside their homes and wear white armbands, as a demonstration of their loyalty to the Serbian authorities. Charles McLeod, who was with the ECMM and visited Prijedor municipality in the last days of August 1992, testified that while visiting a mixed Serb/Bosnian Muslim village he saw that the Bosniak (Bosnian Muslim) houses were identified by a white flag on the roof. This is corroborated by the testimony of Barnabas Mayhew (ECMM), who testified that the Bosnian Muslim houses were marked with white flags to distinguish them from the Serb houses.

=== Attack on Hambarine ===
Hambarine was predominantly Bosniak village in Prijedor municipality. On 22 May 1992, Serb controlled Yugoslav People's Army (JNA) issued an ultimatum to the residents of Hambarine. The residents were to surrender several individuals alleged involved in attack on JNA. The ultimatum was not complied with and around noon the next day the shelling of Hambarine began. The shelling came from three directions from the north-west in the Karane area, from the area of Urije and from the area of Topic Hill. There were two or three Serb tanks and approximately a thousand soldiers during the attack. The bombardment of Hambarine continued until about 15:00. The Bosniak residents tried to defend the village, but they were forced to flee to other villages or to the Kurevo woods to escape the shelling. There were approximately 400 refugees, mostly women, children and elderly people, who fled Hambarine as a result of the attack that saw the Serb soldiers kill, rape and torch houses. A military operation was consequently concentrated on the Kurevo forest.

=== Attack on Kozarac ===
The area of Kozarac, surrounding Kozarac town, comprises several villages, including Kamičani, Kozaruša, Sušići, Brđani, Babići.

After the Serb takeover of Prijedor, the population of Kozarac tried to control the perimeter of their town and organized patrols. After the attack on Hambarine, another ultimatum was issued for the town of Kozarac. Radmilo Željaja delivered the ultimatum on Radio Prijedor, threatening to raze Kozarac to the ground if residents failed to comply. Following the ultimatum, negotiations took place between the Bosniak and the Serb sides which were unsuccessful. Stojan Župljanin, later accused of war crimes by ICTY and one of the most wanted fugitive besides Radovan Karadžić and Ratko Mladić, who led the Serb delegation, said that, unless his conditions were met, the army would take Kozarac by force. As of 21 May 1992, the Serb inhabitants of Kozarac started to leave the town. Kozarac was subsequently surrounded and the phone lines were disconnected. On the night of 22 and 23 May 1992, detonations could be heard in the direction of Prijedor and fires could be seen in the area of Hambarine.

The attack started on 24 May 1992 and ended on 27 May at 13:00 hrs. A military convoy comprising two columns approached Kozarac, and its soldiers opened fire on the houses and checkpoints and, at the same time, shells were fired from the hills. The shooting was aimed at people fleeing from the area. The shelling was intense and unrelenting. Over 5,000 Serb soldiers and combatants participated in the attack. Serb forces included the 343rd Motorised Brigade (an enlarged motorized battalion) supported by two 105 mm howitzer batteries and one M-84 tank squadron. After the shelling, Serb forces shot people in their homes and that those who surrendered were taken to a soccer stadium of Kozarac where some men were randomly shot. After the people had been killed or fled their homes, the soldiers set fire to the houses. There was extensive destruction of property in Kozarac as a result of the attack. The houses had been not only destroyed, but leveled to the ground using heavy machinery. The medical centre in Kozarac was damaged during the attack. The attack continued until 26 May 1992 when it was agreed that the people should leave the territory of Kozarac. A large number of people in Kozarac surrendered that day. The Serb authorities explained that all those who wished to surrender should form a convoy and that a ceasefire would be in effect during this period. It was later learned that when the convoy, which left that day, reached the Banja Luka–Prijedor road the women and men were separated. The women were taken to Trnopolje and the men to Omarska and Keraterm concentration camps, which shocked the world when BBC reporters discovered them. A large number of women and children arrived in Prijedor on the day of the attack. The Prijedor intervention platoon, led by Dado Mrđa, Zoran Babić and others intervened and began to mistreat the women and children. Some time later in that day, buses arrived, and they ordered women and children to board these buses for Trnopolje camp.

No wounded had been allowed out of Kozarac. For example, according to Dr. Merdžanić's testimony before the ICTY he had not been given permission to arrange the evacuation of two injured children, one of whom had her legs completely shattered, and he had instead been told that all the "dirty Muslims" (in Serbian language: balija) should die there, as they would be killed in any event. In the attack at least 100 people were killed, and 1,500 deported to concentration camps. A report sent by colonel Dragan Marčetić to the Serb Army Main Staff dated 27 May 1992 states that the wider area of Kozarac village, i.e. the area of the village of Kozaruša, Trnopolje, Donji Jakupovići, Gornji Jakupovići, Benkovac, Rakovic has been entirely freed of Bosniaks (80–100 Bosniaks were killed, about 1,500 captured and around 100–200 persons were at large on Mt. Kozara).

The Report of the Commission of Experts in Bosnia v. Serbia Genocide Case before the International Court of Justice states that the attack on Kozarac lasted three days and caused many villagers to flee to the forest while the soldiers were shooting at ‘every moving thing’. Survivors calculated that at least 2,000 villagers were killed in that period. The villagers’ defence fell on 26 May. Serbs then reportedly announced that the villagers had 10 minutes to reach the town's soccer stadium. However, many people were shot in their homes before given a chance to leave. One witness reported that several thousand people tried to surrender by carrying white flags, but three Serb tanks opened fire on them, killing many.

=== Attack on Briševo ===
Between the 24 and 25 July 1992, Bosnian Serb Forces attacked the predominantly Croat village of Briševo, near Prijedor. According to the 1991 census, Briševo had a population of 340 people, by ethnicity, 305 Croats, 16 Yugoslavs, 7 Serbs, 1 Bosniak, and 11 others. Violence against ethnic Bosniaks and Croats in towns and villages around Prijedor had been increasing since May 1992, on 30 May 1992, Serbian-controlled Radio-Prijedor proclaimed the creation of a "Crisis Staff of the Serb municipality of Prijedor", that Serb forces had already began an "armed attack on the city of Prijedor" and that Serbs were fighting against Ustashe-Muslim forces", which further contributed to the atmosphere of hostility between the ethnic groups. On 31 May 1992, Serb authorities issued an ultimatum to the inhabitants of Briševo to hand over all weapons, promising the local population would not be harmed if they did, although local Croat leaders complied, Serb forces entered the village that day and arrested prominent Croats and those suspected of supporting the HDZ, these individuals were then taken to internment camps near Sanski Most. On 24 July 1992, Serb forces of the 5th Kozara Brigade from Prijedor and the 6th Krajina Brigade from Sanski Most shelled the village at 9:00 am and then moved into the village by foot. There Serb forces began a two-day massacre, burning homes and property and murdering Croat civilians wherever they were found, many Croatian women were raped before being killed and some victims were even forced to dig their own graves before being killed. Serb forces murdered some 67 Croat civilians, destroyed 65 family homes including the village Catholic Church, those who were not killed were driven out. During the ICTY trials, Milomir Stakić was found guilty of persecution, deportation and extermination against non-Serbs in the Prijedor region, which included the killings in Briševo.

== Camps ==
During and after Kozarac, Hambarine and Briševo massacres, Serb authorities set up concentration camps and determined who should be responsible for the running of those camps.

=== Keraterm camp ===
Keraterm factory was set up as a camp on or around 23/24 May 1992. There were four rooms in the camp, Room 2 being the largest and Room 3 the smallest. By late June 1992, there were about 1,200 people in the camp. Every day people were brought in or taken away from the camp. The numbers increased considerably by late July. The detainees were mostly Bosnian Muslims and to a lesser extent Croats. The detainees slept on wooden pallets used for the transport of goods or on bare concrete in a big storage room. The conditions were cramped and people often had to sleep on top of each other. In June 1992, Room 1 held 320 people and the number continued to grow. The detainees were given one meal a day, made up of two small slices of bread and some sort of stew. The rations were insufficient for the detainees.

=== Omarska camp ===
The Omarska mines complex was located about 20 km from the town of Prijedor. The first detainees were taken to the camp sometime in late May 1992 (between 26 and 30 May). The camp buildings were almost completely full and some of the detainees had to be held on the area between the two main buildings. That area was lit up by specially installed spot-lights after the detainees arrived. Female detainees were held separately in the administrative building. According to the Serb authorities documents from Prijedor, there were a total of 3,334 persons held in the camp from 27 May to 16 August 1992. 3,197 of them were Bosniaks (i.e. Bosnian Muslims), 125 were Croats.

With the arrival of the first detainees, permanent guard posts were established around the camp, and anti-personnel landmines were set up around the camp. The conditions in the camp were horrible. In the building known as the "White House", the rooms were crowded with 45 people in a room no larger than 20 square meters. The faces of the detainees were distorted and bloodstained and the walls were covered with blood. From the beginning, the detainees were beaten, with fists, rifle butts and wooden and metal sticks. The guards mostly hit the heart and kidneys, when they had decided to beat someone to death. In the "garage", between 150 and 160 people were "packed like sardines" and the heat was unbearable. For the first few days, the detainees were not allowed out and were given only a jerry can of water and some bread. Men would suffocate during the night and their bodies would be taken out the following morning. The room behind the restaurant was known as "Mujo's Room". The dimensions of this room were about 12 by 15 metres and the average number of people detained there was 500, most of whom were Bosniaks. The women in the camp slept in the interrogations rooms, which they would have to clean each day as the rooms were covered in blood and pieces of skin and hair. In the camp one could hear the moaning and wailing of people who were being beaten up.

The detainees at Omarska had one meal a day. The food was usually spoiled and the process of getting the food, eating and returning the plate usually lasted around three minutes. Meals were often accompanied by beatings. The toilets were blocked and there was human waste everywhere. Ed Vulliamy, a British journalist, testified that when he visited the camp, the detainees were in a very poor physical condition. He witnessed them eating a bowl of soup and some bread and said that he had the impression they had not eaten in a long time. They appeared to be terrified. The detainees drank water from a river that was polluted with industrial waste and many suffered from constipation or dysentery. No criminal report was ever filed against persons detained in the Omarska camp, nor were the detainees apprised of any concrete charges against them. Apparently, there was no objective reason justifying these people's detention. The Omarska camp was closed immediately after a visit by foreign journalists in early August. On 6 or 7 August 1992, the detainees at Omarska were divided into groups and transported in buses to different destinations. About 1,500 people were transported on 20 buses.

=== Trnopolje camp ===
The Trnoplje camp was set up in the village of Trnoplje on 24 May 1992. The camp was guarded on all sides by the Serb army. There were machine-gun nests and well-armed posts pointing their guns towards the camp. There were several thousand people detained in the camp, the vast majority of whom were Bosnian Muslim and some of them were Croats. According to approximation, on 7 August 1992 there were around 5,000 people detained there. Women and children were detained at the camp as well as men of military age. The camp population had a high turnover with many people staying for less than a week in the camp before joining one of the many convoys to another destination or concentration camps. The quantity of food available was insufficient and people often went hungry. Moreover, the water supply was insufficient and the toilet facilities inadequate. The majority of the detainees slept in the open air. The Serb soldiers used baseball bats, iron bars, rifle butts and their hands and feet or whatever they had at their disposal to beat the detainees. Individuals who were taken out for questioning would often return bruised or injured. Many women who were detained at the Trnopolje camp were taken out of the camp at night by Serb soldiers and raped or sexually assaulted.

Slobodan Kuruzović, the commander of the Trnopolje camp, estimated that between 6,000 and 7,000 people passed through the camp in 1992. Those who passed through the camp were not guilty of any crime. The International Red Cross arrived in the camp in mid-August 1992. A few days later the detainees were registered and received a registration booklet. The camp was officially closed down on 30 September, although there is evidence to suggest that some 3,500 remained for a longer period, until they were transferred to Travnik in Central Bosnia.

=== Other detention facilities ===
There were also other facilities in Prijedor which were used to detain Bosniak and other non-Serb people. Such detention facilities included Yugoslav People's Army barracks, Miška Glava Community Centre and a police building in Prijedor known as the SUP building.

The JNA barracks in Prijedor were known as the Žarko Zgonjanin barracks. They were used as a transition detention center. Some people who were fleeing the cleansing of Bišćani were trapped by Serb soldiers and taken to a command post at Miška Glava. The next morning they were called out, interrogated and beaten. This pattern continued for four or five days. Several men from the village of Rizvanovići were taken out by soldiers and have not been seen since. Around 100 men were arrested in the woods near Kalajevo by JNA soldiers and reserve police and taken to the Miška Glava cultural club. The detention cells were located behind the main SUP building (police building). There was also a courtyard where people were called out at night and beaten up. Prisoners detained in this building were also regularly threatened and insulted. Guards would curse them by calling them "balija", a derogative term for Muslim peasants of low origin.

== Killings in camps ==
Numerous killings, both inside and outside the camps were committed during the Prijedor ethnic cleansing.

On the basis of the evidence presented at the Stakić trial, the Trial Chamber finds that over a hundred people were killed in late July 1992 in the Omarska camp. Around 200 people from Hambarine arrived in the Omarska camp sometime in July 1992. They were initially accommodated in the structure known as the White House. Early in the morning, around 01:00 or 02:00 on 17 July 1992, gunshots were heard that continued until dawn. Dead bodies were seen in front of the White House. The camp guards, one of whom was recognised as Živko Marmat, were shooting rounds into the bodies. Everyone was given an extra bullet that was shot in their heads. The bodies were then loaded onto a truck and taken away. There were about 180 bodies in total.

On 24 July 1992, the massacre at the Keraterm camp, known as the Room 3 massacre was committed as one of the first larger massacres committed inside the camp. New Bosniak detainees from the earlier-cleansed Brdo area were incarcerated in Room 3. For the first few days, the detainees were denied food as well as being subjected to beatings and other physical abuse. On the day of the massacre, a large number of Serb soldiers arrived in the camp, wearing military uniforms and red berets. A machine-gun was placed in front of Room 3. That night, bursts of shooting and moans could be heard coming from Room 3. A machine gun started firing. The next morning there was blood on the walls in Room 3. There were piles of bodies and wounded people. The guards opened the door and said: "Look at these foolish dirty Muslims – they have killed each other". The area outside Room 3 was covered with blood. A truck arrived and one man from Room 1 volunteered to assist with loading the bodies onto the truck. Soon after, the truck with all the bodies left the compound. The volunteer from Room 1 reported that there were 128 dead bodies on the truck. As the truck left, blood could be seen dripping from it. Later that day, a fire engine arrived to clean Room 3 and the surrounding area.

== ICTY/MICT ==
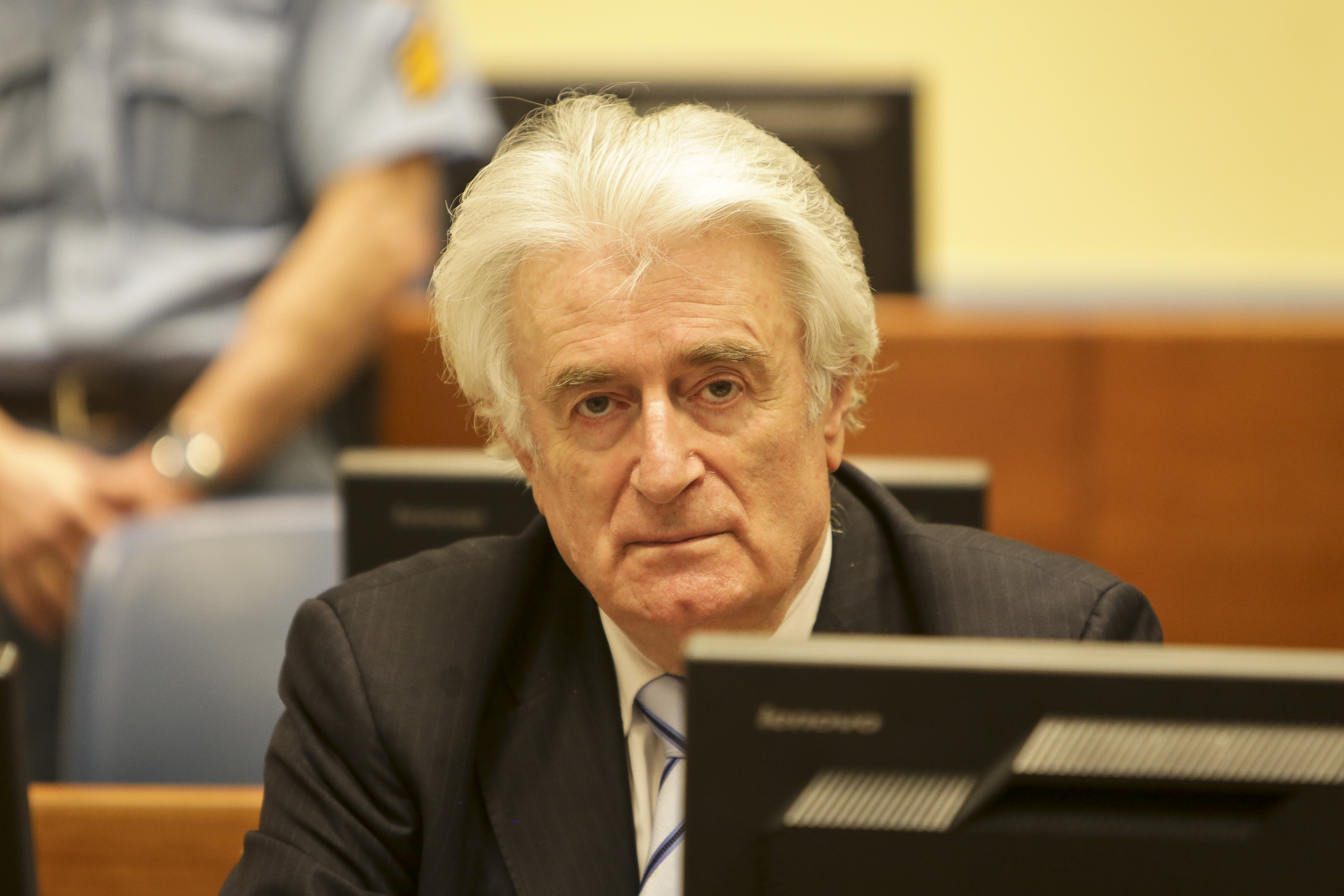
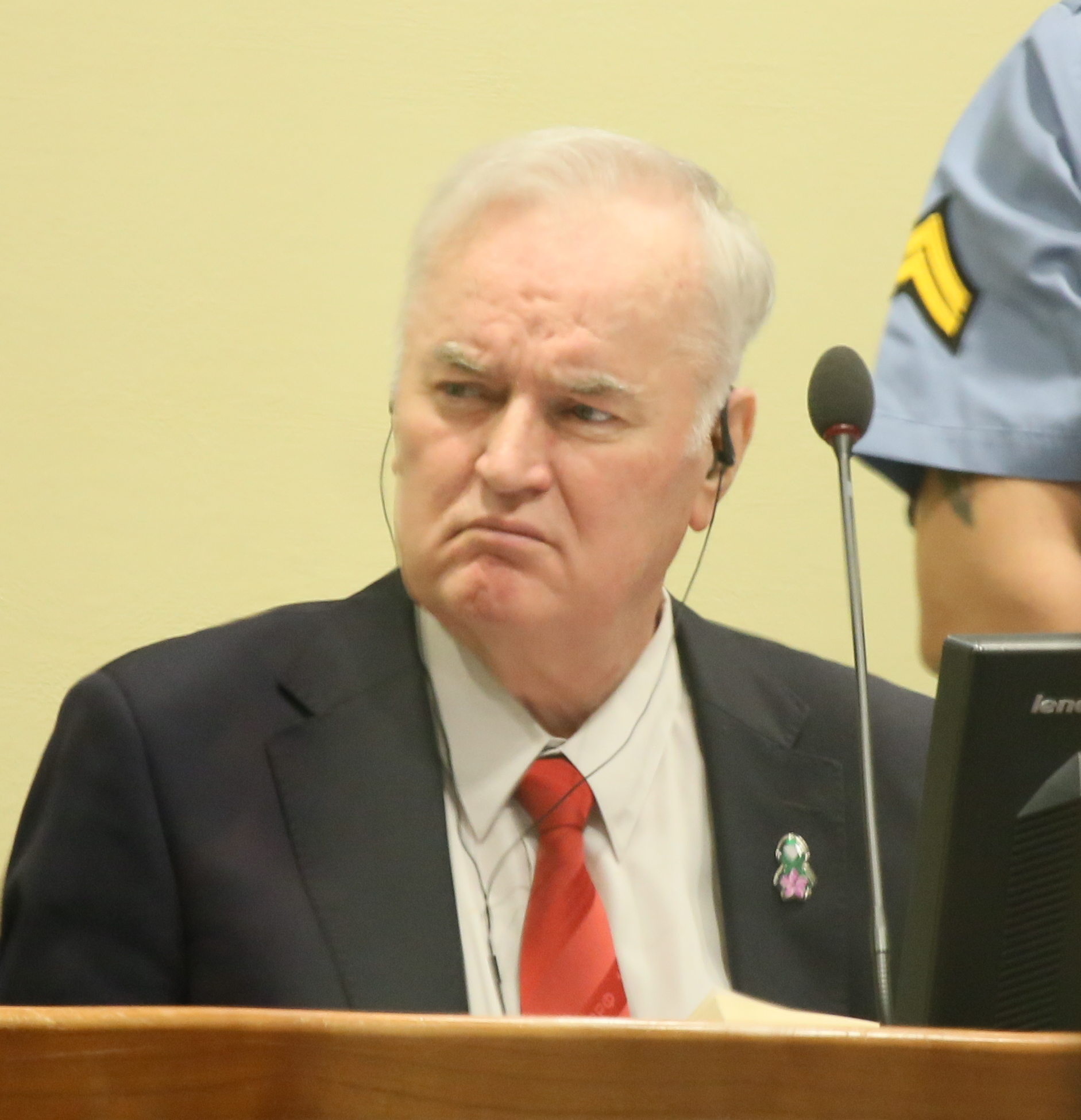
Several people were convicted by the ICTY for crimes in Prijedor, including Radovan Karadžić and Ratko Mladić

The International Criminal Tribunal for the Former Yugoslavia (ICTY) was a body of the UN established to prosecute serious crimes committed during the Yugoslav Wars, and to try their perpetrators. The tribunal was an ad hoc court located in The Hague, Netherlands. It handed down some 20 sentences in relation to crimes perpetrated in the Prijedor municipality, finding the defendants guilty of persecutions on political, racial or religious grounds; murder; inhumane acts; extermination; deportation or forced displacement (crimes against humanity), and wanton destruction of cities, towns or villages or devastation not justified by military necessity; destruction or wilful damage done to institutions dedicated to religion (violations of the laws or customs of war). One notable verdict was against ex-Bosnian Serb leader, Radovan Karadžić, who was convicted for crimes against humanity and war crimes across Bosnia, including Prijedor. He was sentenced to a life in prison. On 22 November 2017, general Ratko Mladić was also sentenced to a life in prison.

Other important convictions included Milomir Stakić, the ex-President of the Prijedor Municipal Assembly, who was sentenced to 40 years in prison, Bosnian Serb politician Momčilo Krajišnik, who was sentenced to 20 years in prison, and Radoslav Brđanin, ex-President of the Autonomous Region of Krajina Crisis Staff, who was handed over a 30 years' jail term. Stojan Župljanin, an ex-police commander who had operational control over the police forces responsible for the detention camps, and Mićo Stanišić, the ex-Minister of the Interior of Republika Srpska, both received 22 years in prison each. Bosnian Serb politician Biljana Plavšić pleaded guilty and admit guilt. She was sentenced to 11 years' in prison for persecution of non-Serbs.

Ex-guards of the Keraterm camp were also convicted: Duško Sikirica was sentenced to 15 years, Damir Došen to 5 years and Dragan Kolundžija to 3 years for beatings, whereas the guards of the Omarska camp were also convicted: Zoran Žigić was sentenced to 25 years, Mlađo Radić to 20 years, Miroslav Kvočka to 7 years imprisonment, Milojica Kos to 6 years and Dragoljub Prcać sentenced to 5 years imprisonment. Predrag Banović, who pleaded guilty to 25 charges, was sentenced to 8 years in prison. Duško Tadić was sentenced to 20 years in jail. Darko Mrđa, an ex-special Bosnian Serb police unit member who was involved in the Korićani Cliffs massacre case, pleaded guilty and was handed over a 17-year jail term.

== Commemorations ==
=== Memorial in Kozarac ===
In 2010, a memorial was opened in Kozarac in remembrance of the Bosniak civilian victims who died in the concentration camps run by Serbian authorities during the war.

=== WWII veterans' association ===
On the occasion of the commemoration in 2015, a group of activists put a white armband on the monument of Partisan hero Mladen Stojanović in Prijedor and also shared this photo on social media. Stojanović was a local partisan leader in the Prijedor area who led important operations between July 1941 and March 1942, including at the Battle of Kozara. As a result, he became a symbolic figure of the liberation struggle against fascism. However, the chairman of the local veterans' association Savez Udruženja Boraca Narodnooslobodilačkog Rata (SUBNOR Association of Fighters of the People's Liberation War) Veljko Rodić, protested against the armband being placed on the statue at a specially convened press conference. His reasoning was that he did not want to allow the memory of Stojanović to be used for other, personal purposes. In addition, he felt he had to point out that the order on May 31, 1992, that non-Serbs should wear white armbands and hang white sheets on houses was a reaction to the attack the day before, when a Muslim formation attacked Prijedor and 15 policemen/soldiers were killed on the side of the defenders. In an open letter, representatives of “Jer me se tiče” responded and denied that the national heroes of World War II belonged only to the veterans. They also emphasized that the symbol of the white armband has become a symbol against fascism, discrimination, ethnic discrimination and denial of war crimes beyond the local occasion. Thus, they argued, that an anti-fascist fighter like Stojanović legitimately belongs in this line of ancestors. The authors of the letter also criticized the behaviour of the World War II veterans during the war years 1992 to 1995 and the fact that they did not participate in the commemoration activities of the ethnic cleansing in Prijedor.

=== Remembrance activities from the Serbian nationalist side ===
In 2000, a 7-metre-high cross with the title “Za krst časni/For the Holy Cross” was erected in a central location. According to the inscription referring to it, it is dedicated to the “fallen soldiers” who gave their lives for their people and the “Republika Srpska/Republic of Bosnian Serbs”. Around this memorial, Serbian nationalist commemorative activities take place under various names. These emphasize one of the narratives that the Serbian side defended the city against Croatian fascists and Muslim extremists. In 2024, a “Dan odbrane grada”/“Day of the Defense of the City” was celebrated on 30 May, the day before the commemoration of the ethnic cleansing. On this occasion, a religious service is held, organized by the Serbian Orthodox Church, wreaths are laid, candles are lit and songs are sung, such as “Veseli se srpski rode”/“Rejoice, Serbian people”, a song referring to Kosovo and “Marš na Drinu”/“March on the Drina”. The celebrations are followed by a parade in the streets of Prijedor, with speeches and a musical program. This event is primarily a reference to the above-mentioned armed attack on 30 May 1992. The organizers of the “Dan odbrane grada” are municipal authorities and veterans' associations.

=== Participation of a mixed group of war veterans in “Dan Bijelih Traka”/"White Armband Day” ===
In 2024, a mixed group of non-Prijedor-based veterans of the war between 1992 and 1995 took part in the commemoration on the 31st of May. They fought in various Bosnian Serb, Croatian and Bosnian armed formations. Their participation was intended to demonstrate their solidarity with all victims of the war and of ethnic cleansing, which is also reflected in their participation in numerous other memorial ceremonies in Bosnia-Herzegovina at which the victims of ethnic groups other than Prijedor are commemorated. A representative of the veterans' group delivered a speech in Prijedor in which he pointed to the supranational and supra-religious character of the event, and also that “no passionate, political speeches are made and that in this way the conditions for dialogue, condemnation of war crimes and solidarity with all victims are created”. The war veterans are supported by the Centar za nenasilnu akciju (Centre for Nonviolent Action). This is a long-standing project since 2008, in which more than 1,000 veterans have taken part in numerous memorial ceremonies in the territory of the former Yugoslavia, but above all in Bosnia-Herzegovina, in order to document their sympathy for the fate of “the other side”.

== See also ==
- List of massacres in the Bosnian War

== Books ==
- Berry, Marie E. (2018). War, Women, and Power: From Violence to Mobilization in Rwanda and Bosnia-Herzegovina. Cambridge University Press. ISBN 9781108416184.
- McDonald, Gabrielle Kirk (2000). Substantive and Procedural Aspects of International Criminal Law: The Experience of International and National Courts: Materials. Vol. 2. BRILL. ISBN 9789041111357.
- Trahan, Jennifer (2006). Genocide, War Crimes, Crimes Against Humanity. Human Rights Watch.
