= Momčilo Gruban =

Bosnian Serb war criminal (born 1961)

- Момчило Грубан
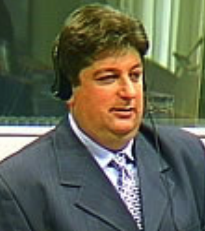
- Gruban at the ICTY in 2002
- Born: 19 June 1961 (age 65); Marićka, PR Bosnia and Herzegovina, SFR Yugoslavia
- Occupation: Reserve policeman
- Employer: Bosnian Serb police
- Status: Conditional release from 31 December 2010
- Convictions: Murder, imprisonment, torture, sexual violence, other inhumane acts, and persecution (as crimes against humanity)
- Penalty: Seven years' imprisonment

Details
- Victims: Non-Serb detainees from the Prijedor region
- Country: Bosnia and Herzegovina
- Location: Omarska concentration camp
- Date apprehended: 2 May 2002

Momčilo Gruban (Serbian Cyrillic: Момчило Грубан; born 19 June 1961), also known as Čkalja (Чкаља), is a Bosnian Serb who was convicted by the Court of Bosnia and Herzegovina (Court of BiH) of crimes against humanity committed at the Omarska concentration camp near Prijedor, Bosnia and Herzegovina, during the Bosnian War.

Gruban was born near the town of Prijedor. In late May 1992 the Omarska camp opened. It held almost exclusively non-Serb detainees from the surrounding districts who had been rounded up during the ethnic cleansing of central Bosanska Krajina. The detainees were kept in deplorable conditions and an atmosphere of severe physical and psychological violence, and had limited access to inadequate and poor quality food, water and medical care. Gruban was the leader of one of the guard shifts, and oversaw the systems of abuse and had an important role in the functions of the camp. The camp was closed in late August following international outcry in the wake of a visit and reporting by a British journalist.

Gruban was indicted by the International Criminal Tribunal for the former Yugoslavia (ICTY) in February 1995, as part of one of the "most important indictments" made by the ICTY. On 2 May 2002, he surrendered to the authorities of Serbia and Montenegro and was transferred into ICTY custody. He entered pleas of not guilty to all counts under the indictment. In April 2006, the ICTY decided to transfer the prosecution of Gruban and his co-accused to the Court of BiH. They were then indicted with crimes against humanity before that court and entered not guilty pleas. Their trial began in December 2006, and the court separated one of Gruban's co-accused from the case in April 2008 under a plea agreement. On 30 May 2008 the court found Gruban and his remaining co-accused guilty of crimes against humanity. In Gruban's case this included command responsibility as a guard shift commander and for participating in a joint criminal enterprise (JCE) directed at “forcefully removing, detaining, and harassing the non-Serb population” of Prijedor. He was sentenced to imprisonment for eleven years. On 16 July 2009, the appellate division of the Court of BiH affirmed his conviction, based on his participation in the JCE only, and reduced his sentence to seven years due to the assistance he extended to several detainees.

On 31 December 2010, Gruban was granted conditional release. In 2014 he was a defence witness during the trial of the former president of the self-proclaimed Bosnian Serb proto-state, Republika Srpska, Radovan Karadžić, and during his testimony he claimed that neither he nor the guards on his shift had committed crimes at Omarska camp.

== Personal details ==
Momčilo Gruban was born on 19 June 1961 in the village of Marićka near Prijedor, SR Bosnia and Herzegovina, Yugoslavia. He is of Bosnian Serb ethnicity.

== Establishment of concentration camps at Prijedor ==
Location of Prijedor and Banja Luka within Bosnia and Herzegovina

In September 1991, as Yugoslavia continued to break up, several Bosnian Serb autonomous regions were proclaimed in Bosnia and Herzegovina, which then each established what was known as a crisis staff. Each crisis staff consisted of the leaders of the Bosnian Serb-dominated Serb Democratic Party (SDS), the local Yugoslav People's Army (JNA) commander, and Bosnian Serb police officials. Initially the Serb Autonomous Region of Krajina (ARK) did not include the Prijedor municipality – which incorporated the town itself and some outlying villages. Before the war, the population of the municipality was 44 per cent Bosnian Muslim, 42.5 per cent Bosnian Serb, 5.6 per cent Bosnian Croat, with the rest identifying as Yugoslav, Ukrainian, Russian or Italian. Within the municipality the local government was run by the Bosnian Muslim-dominated Party of Democratic Action (SDA), which had a small majority. On 30 April 1992, the SDS, assisted by police and military forces, took over the town of Prijedor, and JNA soldiers occupied all the prominent institutions in the town. A local crisis staff was created, reporting to the ARK crisis staff in the city of Banja Luka 50 km (31 mi) to the east.

Immediately after the Bosnian Serb takeover of the municipality, non-Serbs were targeted for abusive treatment. After the JNA elements in Bosnia and Herzegovina became the Bosnian Serb Army (VRS) on 20 May, majority non-Serb villages in the Prijedor area were attacked by the VRS, and the population rounded up, although some fled. This occurred in Prijedor town itself on 30 May. Older men, and women and children were separated from men of fighting age, who were transported to the police station in Prijedor then bussed to either the Omarska or Keraterm concentration camps. The elderly men, women and children were generally taken to the Trnopolje concentration camp. All three camps were in the wider Prijedor municipality. Non-Serb community leaders were included in the roundup and sent to one of the camps.

== Gruban's activities at the Omarska concentration camp ==
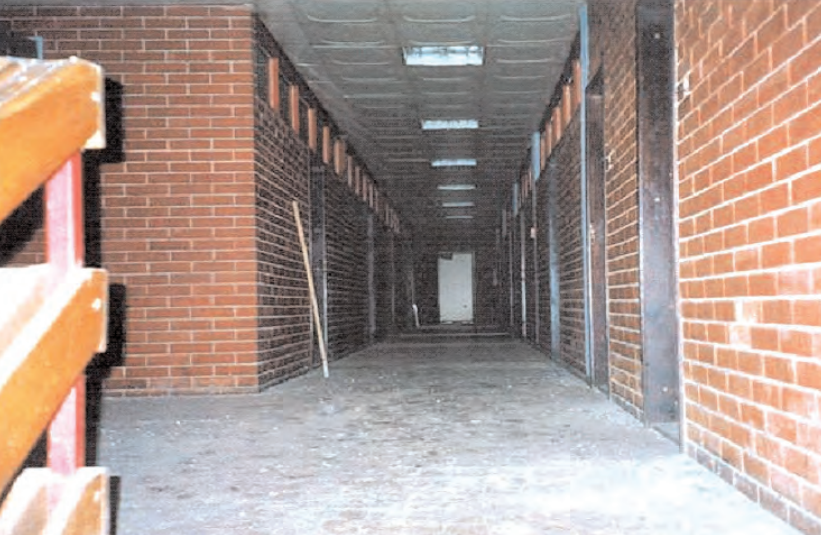
The hallway within the Omarska concentration camp where detainees were interrogated

The Omarska camp was situated at the Ljubija iron ore mine. Preparations for its operation began around 25 May 1992, and the first group of detainees arrived on the night of 27–28 May and the last arrived around 21 August. Every detainee was interrogated at least once, usually involving severe mental and physical abuse. According to the Bosnian Serb authorities, a total of 3,334 detainees were held at the camp for some time during its almost three month operation, but other sources place the number around 5,000 to 7,000. The bulk of the detainees were men, although 36 to 38 women were also detained in the camp. The detainees were almost all Bosnian Muslims or Bosnian Croats, with a few Bosnian Serbs held due to suspicions they had been collaborating with Bosnian Muslims. While held at the camp, detainees were kept in appalling conditions, and there was a pervasive atmosphere of extreme mental and physical violence. Intimidation, extortion, beatings, and torture were commonplace. Murder was common. Food and water provided were of poor quality and medical care was grossly inadequate.

While the camp was operating, Gruban – known to the detainees as Čkalja – was a commander of one of three guard shifts. He had a "position of power in relation to police guards" which he did not utilise to fully prevent abuse. He did nothing that would have been "decisive to urgently stop and destroy the camp system", nor did he exclude himself from it in order to show that he did not want the aim to be achieved. Gruban participated in the systematic joint criminal enterprise (JCE) constituted by the operation of the camp through his implementation of the system of abuse within it and by fulfilling an important role in its functioning.

On 7 August 1992, the British journalist Ed Vulliamy reported on the shocking conditions in the Omarska and Trnopolje camps, having visited them in the preceding days at the invitation of the president of the self-proclaimed Bosnian Serb proto-state, Republika Srpska, Radovan Karadžić. The international outcry that arose from Vulliamy's reporting and photographs of emaciated detainees caused the Bosnian Serbs to close the Omarska camp soon after, although many of the detainees were just moved to other camps.

== Indictment, surrender and transfer of case to Bosnia and Herzegovina ==
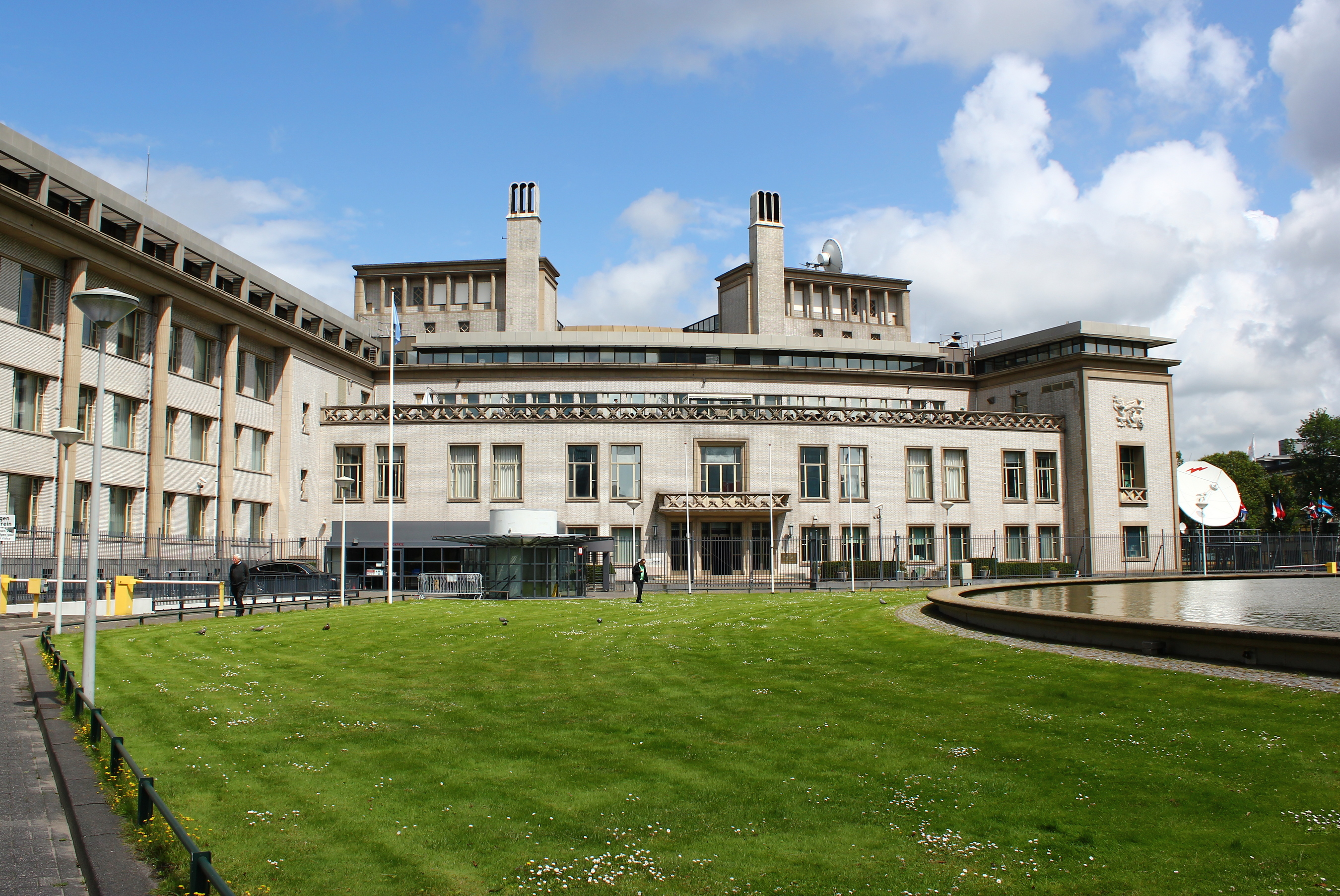
Knežević was indicted by the International Criminal Tribunal for the former Yugoslavia in February 1995

In 1993, the International Criminal Tribunal for the former Yugoslavia (ICTY) was established by the United Nations (UN) to prosecute war crimes that took place in the Balkans in the 1990s. On 10 February 1995, Gruban, along with 18 other persons allegedly involved in the running of the Omarska camp, was indicted by the ICTY under Case Number IT-95-4. This indictment was described as one of the "most important indictments" made by the ICTY. On 20 December 1995, the Bosnian War ended when the Dayton Agreement came into force, along with the North Atlantic Treaty Organisation (NATO)-led multi-national peace enforcement operation known as the Implementation Force (IFOR). After a year during which the peace agreement between the former warring parties was successfully implemented, the NATO-led Stabilisation Force took over on 20 December 1996.

On 8 May 1998, the ICTY prosecutor withdrew the charges against eleven of the nineteen people indicted over the operation of the Omarska camp under Case Number IT-95-4. As a result, the amended Omarska indictment included only Gruban, Željko Mejakić, Dušan Knežević, and five others. The prosecutor stated that the withdrawal of these accused people from the indictments resulted from a re-evaluation of the investigative and prosecutorial strategies of the ICTY to prioritise the most serious cases, and the fact that none of those against whom charges had been withdrawn had yet been arrested or surrendered to the court, increasing the anticipated number of separate trials. On 9 November 1998, the ICTY announced that its prosecutor had been granted leave to withdraw four accused from the amended Omarska and Keraterm indictments and consolidate their charges under a single and separate indictment. This left Gruban, Mejakić, Knežević and one other accused on the amended Omarska indictment. In April 2000, the fourth accused on the Omarska indictment was severed from it and joined to another case. In November 2001, Predrag Banović, who had been indicted for alleged crimes committed at the Keraterm concentration camp, was transferred to ICTY custody and a new Keraterm case was established under Case Number IT-95-8/1, in which he was included. When another Keraterm indictee, Dušan Fuštar, was transferred into ICTY custody in January 2002, he was joined to the new case.

Gruban surrendered to the authorities of Serbia and Montenegro on 2 May 2002, and was transferred into the custody of the ICTY on the same day. He made his first appearance before the court on 10 May when he entered pleas of not guilty to all charges against him. Knežević surrendered to the authorities of Bosnia and Herzegovina on 18 May 2002, and was transferred into the custody of the ICTY on the following day. On 20 July, Gruban was provisionally released from the ICTY Detention Unit with terms and conditions, including that he would return to the ICTY when ordered. In September 2002, the remaining three accused on the original Omarska indictment Case Number IT-95-4 (Gruban, Mejakić and Knežević) were joined to those accused in the new Keraterm indictment Case Number IT-95-8/1 (Knežević, Banović and Fuštar) and a new consolidated case was created against Case Number IT-02-65. On 21 November 2002 this consolidated indictment became the operative ICTY indictment against the five co-accused. Gruban returned to the ICTY on 9 December 2002, the following day he entered a plea of not guilty to the charges in the operative indictment, and was released again. In June 2003, Banović came to a plea agreement with the prosecution and was withdrawn from the operative indictment and dealt with separately. On 1 July 2003, Mejakić surrendered to the authorities of Serbia and Montenegro, and was transferred into ICTY custody on 4 July. On 18 July 2005 Gruban returned to ICTY custody.

The operative indictment comprised the following counts against Gruban on the basis of individual responsibility under Article 7(1) and command responsibility under Article 7(3) of the ICTY statute:

- Count 1 – Persecutions on political, racial or religious grounds, a crime against humanity – Article 5(h)
- Count 2 – Murder, a crime against humanity – Article 5(a)
- Count 3 – Murder, a violation of the laws or customs of war – Article 3
- Count 4 – Inhumane acts, a crime against humanity – Article 5(i)
- Count 5 – Cruel treatment, a violation of the laws or customs of war – Article 3

On 7 April 2006, the ICTY announced that its appeals chamber had upheld a decision to transfer the prosecution of Gruban, Mejakić, Knežević and Fuštar to the Court of Bosnia and Herzegovina (Court of BiH) under ICTY Rule 11bis. In 2005, as part of the process of concluding its mandate pursuant to resolutions of the United Nations Security Council, the ICTY had begun transferring middle and lower-level indictees to the courts of the countries of the former Yugoslavia. Such transfers were subject to various conditions. On 9 May 2006, the case against Gruban, Mejakić, Knežević and Fuštar was transferred to Bosnia and Herzegovina for trial, and they were all transferred into the custody of Bosnia and Herzegovina on the same day. From this point on, the ICTY monitored proceedings at the Court of BiH and received regular progress reports from the Organization for Security and Co-operation in Europe's mission to Bosnia and Herzegovina on the prosecution, sentencing and appeals.

== Trial, sentencing, appeal and release ==
On 7 July 2006, the prosecutor of Bosnia and Herzegovina issued an indictment charging Gruban, Mejakić, Knežević and Fuštar with crimes against humanity. Gruban was indicted for the following crimes under various subparagraphs of Article 172(1) of the Criminal Code of Bosnia and Herzegovina, namely:

- (a) depriving another person of his life (murder);
- (e) imprisonment (arbitrary and unlawful confinement of camp detainees);
- (f) torture (beatings and other physical abuse);
- (g) sexual violence (rapes and other forms of sexual abuse);
- (k) other inhumane acts (confinement in inhumane conditions, harassment, humiliation and other psychological abuse); and
- (h) persecution.

The indictment was confirmed by the Court of BiH a week later. On 28 July 2006, all four accused pleaded not guilty. The trial commenced on 20 December 2006. The court separated Fuštar from the case on 17 April 2008 as he wished to enter into a plea agreement. The trial of Gruban, Mejakić and Knežević continued, and the court rendered its first instance verdict on 30 May 2008.

Gruban was found guilty of all the crimes against humanity under article 172(1) with which he had been indicted. This finding was both on the basis of command responsibility as a guard shift commander and also under the JCE for furthering the camp's system of mistreatment and persecution of detainees. He was sentenced to imprisonment for eleven years. His co-defendants were also found guilty of crimes against humanity. Gruban appealed the first instance verdict, claiming that there had been violations of the Criminal Code, the Criminal Procedure Code, and in the establishment of facts, and on the basis of issues related to his sentencing.

On 20 July 2009, the appellate panel of the Court of BiH rendered its final and binding verdict in the case, described by the OSCE as "deemed generally as a clear and well-structured decision". The panel accepted part of Gruban's appeal, finding that Gruban was not a "guard shift commander" but a "guard shift leader", although this did not affect his guilt for the crimes he had committed. It also revised the basis of Gruban's conviction, stating that the basis for his criminal liability was under the JCE, which, as the broadest form of responsibility, encompassed any command or individual liability. The appeal panel also reduced his sentence to seven years, as it considered that Gruban's actions to reduce the suffering of detainees had not been given sufficient weight by the trial panel, and the purpose of his punishment could be achieved by a shorter sentence. The appeal panel also revised the amount of credit that Gruban received for his time in custody at the ICTY. On 24 July, Gruban began his sentence at the Penal Correctional Institution in Banja Luka, the nearest prison to his home in Prijedor. On 31 December 2010, he was granted conditional release.

The OSCE observed that the appeal panel in this case had clarified several previously unsettled aspects of the domestic law of Bosnia and Herzegovina regarding JCE. Firstly, that JCE could legally be applied to domestic war crimes prosecutions, and also how JCE should relate to direct and command responsibility for crimes.

In February 2014, Gruban testified as a defence witness in the ICTY trial of Karadžić on charges of genocide, war crimes and crimes against humanity. During his testimony he stated that only those who "participated in an armed rebellion" were held at Omarska, and denied he or the guards on his shift had committed crimes at the camp.
