= Dušan Knežević =

Dušan Knežević may refer to:

- Dušan Knežević (war criminal) (born 1967), Bosnian Serb war criminal
- Dušan Knežević (basketball) (born 1980), Serbian basketball player
