= White Armband Day =

Remembrance day in Bosnia and Herzegovina

White Armband Day or White Ribbon Day (Bosnian: Dan bijelih traka; Serbo-Croatian Cyrillic: Дан бијелих трака) is a day of remembrance of the events that began on 31 May 1992 in the Prijedor municipality. On that day, the forcibly installed authorities, and its Crisis Staff, issued an order to all non-Serbs to display white linen on their homes, while non-Serbs, mostly Bosniaks and Croats, had to wear white armband in public places.

The campaign was an introduction to the ethnic cleansing of the non-Serb population and the genocide of Bosniaks in the Prijedor area. During the three and a half years of war in the Prijedor area, 3,176 people were killed. Tens of thousands of people passed through the concentration camps, such as Omarska, Trnopolje and Keraterm, who were subjected to mass executions, rape crimes, various types of torture, as well as crimes against humanity. Also, 102 children under the age of 18 were killed in Prijedor. White Armband Day is commemorated every year in some cities of Bosnia and Herzegovina, as well as cities around the world.

== See also ==
- Srebrenica massacre
- Srebrenica memorial
