= Dušan Knežević (war criminal) =

Bosnian Serb war criminal (born 1967)

- Душан Кнежевић
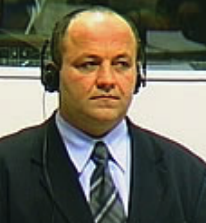
- Knežević at the ICTY
- Born: 17 June 1967 (age 59); Orlovći near Prijedor in Bosnia and Herzegovina
- Occupation: waiter
- Known for: crimes against humanity
- Convictions: murder, torture, sexual violence, other inhumane acts, and persecution (as crimes against humanity)
- Criminal charges: murder, torture, sexual violence, other inhumane acts, and persecution (as crimes against humanity)
- Penalty: 31 years' imprisonment
- Capture status: surrendered

Details
- Victims: Non-Serb detainees from the Prijedor region
- Country: Bosnia and Herzegovina
- Locations: Omarska and Keraterm concentration camps
- Date apprehended: 18 May 2002

Dušan Knežević (Serbian Cyrillic: Душан Кнежевић; (Note: Serbian pronunciation: [dǔʃan kněːʒeʋit͡ɕ]) born 17 June 1967), sometimes known as Duško (Душко), (Note: Serbian: [dûʃko]) is a Bosnian Serb who was found guilty by the Court of Bosnia and Herzegovina (Court of BiH) of murder, torture, sexual violence, other inhumane acts, and persecution – constituting crimes against humanity under the criminal code of Bosnia and Herzegovina – committed at the Omarska and Keraterm concentration camps in Prijedor, Bosnia and Herzegovina, during the Bosnian War.

Knežević was born near Prijedor and worked as a waiter prior to the Bosnian War. In late May 1992 the Omarska and Keraterm camps were opened. They held almost exclusively non-Serb detainees from the surrounding districts who had been rounded up during the ethnic cleansing of central Bosanska Krajina. The detainees were kept in deplorable conditions and an atmosphere of severe physical and psychological violence, and had limited access to inadequate and poor quality food, water and medical care. Between May and August 1992, despite not having an official position within either camp, Knežević entered them at will where, along with guards and other visitors, he participated in physical beatings of detainees on a daily basis, some of whom died as a result of the beatings. The Keraterm camp closed in early August. The Omarska camp was closed in late August following international outcry in the wake of a visit and reporting by British journalist Ed Vulliamy, although many detainees were merely transferred to other camps.

Knežević was indicted by the International Criminal Tribunal for the former Yugoslavia (ICTY) in February 1995, as part of one of the "most important indictments" made by the ICTY. On 18 May 2002, he surrendered to the authorities of Bosnia and Herzegovina and was transferred into ICTY custody. He entered pleas of not guilty to all counts under both the Omarska and Keraterm indictments. In April 2006, the ICTY referral chamber decided to transfer the prosecution of Knežević and his co-accused Željko Mejakić, Dušan Fuštar and Momčilo Gruban to the Court of BiH as part of the process of the ICTY concluding its mandate. They were then indicted with crimes against humanity by the prosecutor of Bosnia and Herzegovina and entered not guilty pleas. Their trial began in December 2006, and the court separated Fuštar from the case in April 2008 under a plea agreement. On 30 May 2008 the court found Knežević and his remaining co-accused guilty of crimes against humanity, including participating in a joint criminal enterprise directed at “forcefully removing, detaining, and harassing the non-Serb population” of Prijedor. Knežević was convicted of direct involvement in killings, tortures and other inhumane acts committed in both camps, and was sentenced to long-term imprisonment for 31 years. The court worked under the assumption that Knežević's motive for his crimes was that he was trying to find information about the individual who had killed his brother during the war, and found that his responsibility for the crimes he committed was not diminished as he wished to commit the crimes “in an extremely cruel way.” His conviction and sentence were upheld on appeal.

== Early life and work ==
Dušan Knežević was born on 17 June 1967 in the village of Orlovći near Prijedor, SR Bosnia and Herzegovina, Yugoslavia. He is of Bosnian Serb ethnicity, and prior to the Bosnian War he was working as a waiter.

== Establishment of concentration camps at Prijedor ==
Location of Prijedor and Banja Luka within Bosnia and Herzegovina

In September 1991, as Yugoslavia continued to break up, several Bosnian Serb autonomous regions were proclaimed in Bosnia and Herzegovina, which then each established what was known as a crisis staff. Each crisis staff consisted of the leaders of the Bosnian Serb-dominated Serb Democratic Party (SDS), the local Yugoslav People's Army (JNA) commander, and Bosnian Serb police officials. Initially the Serb Autonomous Region of Krajina (ARK) did not include the Prijedor municipality – which incorporated the town itself and some outlying villages. Before the war, the population of the municipality was 44 per cent Bosnian Muslim, 42.5 per cent Bosnian Serb, 5.6 per cent Bosnian Croat, with the rest identifying as Yugoslav, Ukrainian, Russian or Italian. Within the municipality the local government was run by the Bosnian Muslim-dominated Party of Democratic Action (SDA), which had a small majority. On 30 April 1992, the SDS, assisted by police and military forces, took over the town of Prijedor, and JNA soldiers occupied all the prominent institutions in the town. A local crisis staff was created, reporting to the ARK crisis staff in the city of Banja Luka 50 km (31 mi) to the east. Immediately after the Bosnian Serb takeover of the municipality, non-Serbs were targeted for abusive treatment. After the JNA elements in Bosnia and Herzegovina became the Bosnian Serb Army (VRS) on 20 May, majority non-Serb villages in the Prijedor area were attacked by the VRS, and the population rounded up, although some fled. This occurred in Prijedor town itself on 30 May. Older men, and women and children were separated from men of fighting age, who were transported to the police station in Prijedor then bussed to either the Omarska or Keraterm concentration camps. The elderly men, women and children were generally taken to the Trnopolje concentration camp. All three camps were in the wider Prijedor municipality. Non-Serb community leaders were included in the roundup and sent to one of the camps.

== Knežević's activities at the Omarska and Keraterm concentration camps ==
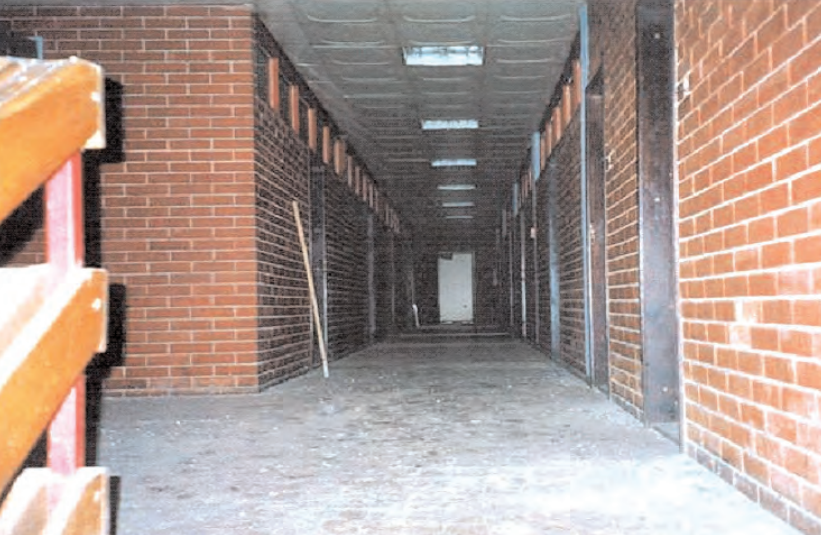
The hallway within the Prijedor concentration where detainees were interrogated

The Omarska camp was situated at the Ljubija iron ore mine. Preparations for its operation began around 25 May 1992, and the first group of detainees arrived on the night of 27–28 May and the last arrived around 21 August. Every detainee was interrogated at least once, usually involving severe mental and physical abuse. According to the Bosnian Serb authorities, a total of 3,334 detainees were held at the camp for some time during its almost three month operation, but other sources place the number around 5,000 to 7,000. The bulk of the detainees were men, although 36 to 38 women were also detained in the camp. The detainees were almost all Bosnian Muslims or Bosnian Croats, with a few Bosnian Serbs held due to suspicions they had been collaborating with Bosnian Muslims. While held at the camp, detainees were kept in appalling conditions, and there was a pervasive atmosphere of extreme mental and physical violence. Intimidation, extortion, beatings, and torture were commonplace. Murder was common. Food and water provided were of poor quality and medical care was grossly inadequate.

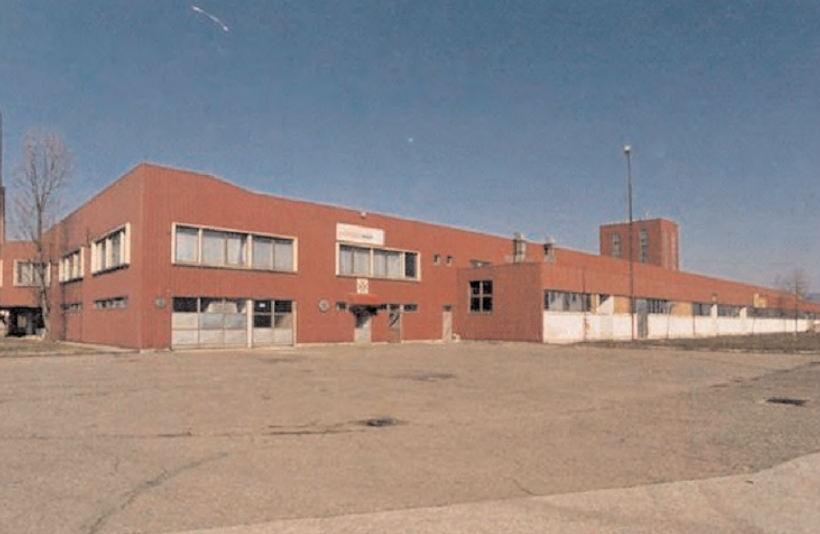
The Keraterm concentration camp was established in a former ceramics factory near Prijedor.

The Keraterm camp operated in a similar manner to the Omarska camp, was located at a former ceramic factory in the suburb of Čirkin Polje in Prijedor, and operated from 24 May to 5 August. Like Omarska, Keraterm only held a small number of female detainees, and most of the 1,000 to 1,500 detainees were Bosnian Muslim men, with a few Bosnian Croats. The conditions and the atmosphere in the Keraterm camp were similar to those at Omarska.

While the two camps were operating, Knežević – known to the detainees as Duča – despite having no official role at the camps, entered them whenever he wished and without hindrance, and along with the guards and other visitors physically abused detainees on a daily basis, participating in "cruel beatings", following which some died, some were killed, and others went missing.

On 7 August 1992, the British journalist Ed Vulliamy reported on the shocking conditions in the Omarska and Trnopolje camps, having visited them in the preceding days at the invitation of the president of the self-proclaimed Bosnian Serb proto-state, Republika Srpska, Radovan Karadžić. The international outcry that arose from Vulliamy's reporting and photographs of emaciated detainees caused the Bosnian Serbs to close the Omarska camp soon after, although many of the detainees were just moved to other camps.

== Indictment, surrender and transfer of case to Bosnia and Herzegovina ==
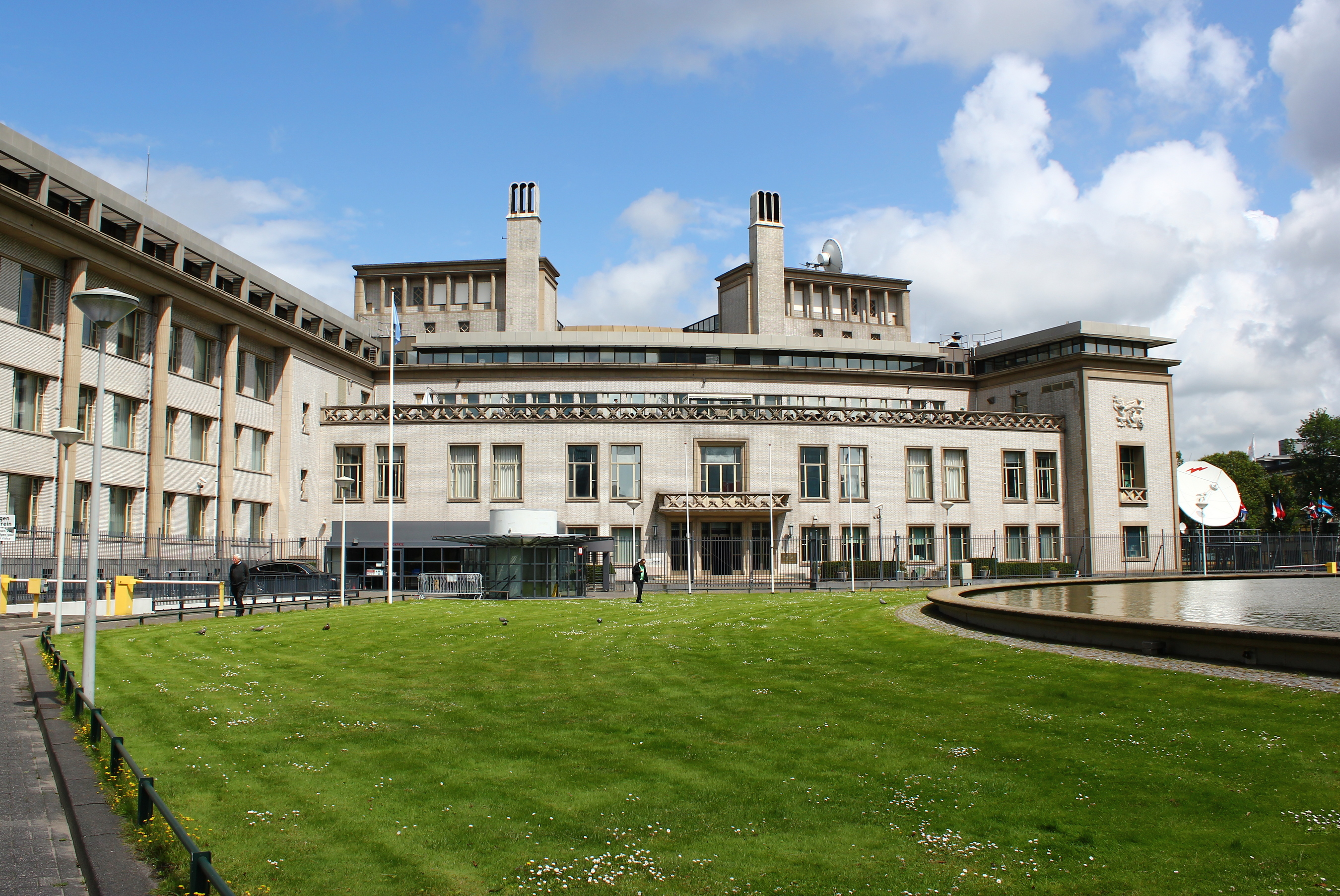
Knežević was indicted by the International Criminal Tribunal for the former Yugoslavia in February 1995

In 1993, the International Criminal Tribunal for the former Yugoslavia (ICTY) was established by the United Nations (UN) to prosecute war crimes that took place in the Balkans in the 1990s. On 10 February 1995, Knežević, along with 18 other persons allegedly involved in the running of the Omarska camp, was indicted by the ICTY under Case Number IT-95-4. This indictment was described as one of the "most important indictments" made by the ICTY. In July 1995, Knežević, along with 12 other persons allegedly involved in the running of the Keraterm camp, was indicted by the ICTY under Case Number IT-95-8. On 20 December 1995, the Bosnian War ended when the Dayton Agreement came into force, along with the North Atlantic Treaty Organisation (NATO)-led multi-national peace enforcement operation known as the Implementation Force (IFOR). After a year during which the peace agreement between the former warring parties was successfully implemented, the NATO-led Stabilisation Force (SFOR) took over on 20 December 1996.

On 5 May 1998, the ICTY prosecutor withdrew the charges against five of the accused over the operation of the Keraterm camp under Case Number IT-95-8, and three days later, against eleven of the nineteen people indicted over the operation of the Omarska camp under Case Number IT-95-4. As a result, the amended Keraterm indictment included only Knežević, Dušan Fuštar, Predrag Banović, and five others, and the amended Omarska indictment included only Knežević, Željko Mejakić, Momčilo Gruban, and five others. The prosecutor stated that the withdrawal of these accused people from the indictments resulted from a re-evaluation of the investigative and prosecutorial strategies of the ICTY to prioritise the most serious cases, and the fact that none of those against whom charges had been withdrawn had yet been arrested or surrendered to the court, increasing the anticipated number of separate trials. On 9 November 1998, the ICTY announced that its prosecutor had been granted leave to withdraw four accused from the amended Omarska and Keraterm indictments and consolidate their charges under a single and separate indictment. This left Knežević, Mejakić, Gruban and one other accused on the amended Omarska indictment. In April 2000, the fourth accused on the Omarska indictment was severed from it and joined to another case. The indictment in the Keraterm case was amended in August 1999 and again in January 2001. Because only three of the accused from the Keraterm indictment were in custody at this time, a trial of these three under Case Number IT-95-8 commenced in March 2001 and was completed in November 2001. In the same month as that trial concluded, Banović was transferred to ICTY custody and a new Keraterm case was established under Case Number IT-95-8/1, in which he was included. When Fuštar was transferred into ICTY custody in January 2002, he was joined to the new case.

Knežević surrendered to the authorities of Bosnia and Herzegovina on 18 May 2002, and was transferred into the custody of the ICTY on the following day. He made his first appearance before the court on 24 May 2002 when he entered pleas of not guilty to all charges against him under both indictments. Gruban had surrendered two weeks earlier and was already in ICTY custody. In September 2002, the remaining three accused on the original Omarska indictment Case Number IT-95-4 (Knežević, Mejakić and Gruban) were joined to those accused in the new Keraterm indictment Case Number IT-95-8/1 (Knežević, Banović and Fuštar) and a new consolidated case was created against Case Number IT-02-65. On 21 November 2002 this consolidated indictment became the operative ICTY indictment against the five co-accused. In June 2003, Banović came to a plea agreement with the prosecution and was withdrawn from the operative indictment and dealt with separately. On 1 July 2003, Mejakić surrendered to the authorities of Serbia and Montenegro and was transferred into ICTY custody.

The operative indictment comprised the following counts against Knežević on the basis of individual responsibility under Article 7(1) of the ICTY statute:

- Count 1 – Persecutions on political, racial or religious grounds, a crime against humanity – Article 5(h)
- Count 2 – Murder, a crime against humanity – Article 5(a)
- Count 3 – Murder, a violation of the laws or customs of war – Article 3
- Count 4 – Inhumane acts, a crime against humanity – Article 5(i)
- Count 5 – Cruel treatment, a violation of the laws or customs of war – Article 3

On 7 April 2006, the ICTY announced that its appeals chamber had upheld a decision to transfer the prosecution of Knežević, Mejakić, Fuštar and Gruban to the Court of Bosnia and Herzegovina (Court of BiH) under ICTY Rule 11bis. In 2005, as part of the process of concluding its mandate pursuant to resolutions of the United Nations Security Council, the ICTY had begun transferring middle and lower-level indictees to the courts of the countries of the former Yugoslavia. Such transfers were subject to various conditions. On 9 May 2006, the case against Knežević, Mejakić, Fuštar and Gruban was transferred to Bosnia and Herzegovina for trial, and they were all transferred into the custody of Bosnia and Herzegovina on the same day. From this point on, the ICTY monitored proceedings at the Court of BiH and received regular progress reports from the Organization for Security and Co-operation in Europe's mission to Bosnia and Herzegovina on the prosecution, sentencing and appeals. From this point on, the ICTY monitored proceedings at the Court of BiH and received regular progress reports on the prosecution, sentencing and appeals.

== Trial, sentencing and appeal ==
On 7 July 2006, the prosecutor of Bosnia and Herzegovina issued an indictment charging Knežević, Mejakić, Gruban and Fuštar with crimes against humanity. Knežević was indicted for the following crimes at the Omarska camp under various subparagraphs of Article 172(1) of the Criminal Code of Bosnia and Herzegovina, namely:

- (a) depriving another person of his life (murder);
- (e) imprisonment (arbitrary and unlawful confinement of camp detainees);
- (f) torture (beatings and other physical abuse);
- (g) sexual violence (rapes and other forms of sexual abuse);
- (k) other inhumane acts (confinement in inhumane conditions, harassment, humiliation and other psychological abuse); and
- (h) persecution.

Knežević was also indicted for the same crimes at the Keraterm camp under the same subparagraphs of Article 172(1) of the Criminal Code of Bosnia and Herzegovina, except subparagraph (g). The indictments against Knežević were confirmed by the Court of BiH a week later. On 28 July 2006, all four accused pleaded not guilty. The trial commenced on 20 December 2006. The court separated Fuštar from the case on 17 April 2008 as he wished to enter into a plea agreement. The trial of Knežević, Mejakić and Gruban continued, and the court rendered its first instance verdict on 30 May 2008.

Knežević was found guilty of all the crimes against humanity under article 172(1) with which he had been indicted. This finding was on the basis of individual responsibility, and also under the JCE directed at “forcefully removing, detaining, and harassing the non-Serb population” of Prijedor.. He was sentenced to long-term imprisonment (Note: "Long-term imprisonment" is the most severe criminal sanction prescribed in the criminal law of Bosnia and Herzegovina. It is a special form of imprisonment, the term of which can range from 20 to 45 years. In comparison to “ordinary imprisonment", a slightly different regime applies to it (e.g. concerning punishment in conjunction, suspended sentence, pardon etc.). It is prescribed for the gravest forms of serious criminal offences perpetrated with intent. Under existing regulations, this punishment is prescribed for criminal offences against the integrity of the state and for crimes against humanity and values protected by international law.) for 31 years. His co-defendants were also found guilty of crimes against humanity. Knežević appealed the first instance verdict, claiming that there had been violations of the Criminal Code, the Criminal Procedure Code, and in the establishment of facts.

On 20 July 2009, the appellate panel of the Court of BiH rendered its final and binding verdict in the case, described by the OSCE as "deemed generally as a clear and well-structured decision". The panel revised the basis of Knežević's conviction, stating that the basis for his criminal liability was under the JCE, which, as the broadest form of responsibility, encompassed any individual liability. The panel confirmed Knežević's conviction and sentence. The court worked under the assumption that Knežević's motive was that he was trying to find information about the individual who had killed his brother during the war, and found that Knezevic’s responsibility for the crimes he committed was not diminished because he wished to commit the crimes “in an extremely cruel way.” The OSCE observed that the appeal panel in this case had clarified several previously unsettled aspects of the domestic law of Bosnia and Herzegovina regarding JCE. Firstly, that JCE could legally be applied to domestic war crimes prosecutions, and also how JCE should relate to direct and command responsibility for crimes.

On 24 July 2009, Knežević began his sentence at the Penal Correctional Institution in Foča, the only facility in the Republika Srpska entity of Bosnia and Herzegovina that can house prisoners serving sentences of long-term imprisonment.
