= Vehid Gunić =

Bosnian journalist

Vehid Gunić (Kozarac, 9 February 1941 – Sarajevo, 29 April 2017) was a Bosnian journalist. He worked for many years as a journalist, presenter and editor for Radio Television Sarajevo, later Radio Television Bosnia and Herzegovina. He has so far published some twenty books of historical studies, travel writings, interviews, documentary prose, and several books of sevdalinka with commentary. His titles include: 'Kozarac as it once was', 'Notes on the universality of ignoramuses', 'Bosnia of my birth, we have gone far away', 'The beauty of returning to Bosnia', 'Sevdalinka about cities', 'Meraklije', 'Fear of smoking', 'Sarajevo's screams', and others. His books have been published in Norway, Switzerland, Australia as well as Bosnia.

Vehid Gunić was for years among the most popular Bosnian journalists. Until the outbreak of the war in Bosnia and Herzegovina in 1992, he edited and presented the then Sarajevo Television series "Meraklije', which was one of the most popular programmes in the former Yugoslavia, with among the highest viewer ratings. In the latest programmes in this series, Gunic rescued from oblivion and preserved for posterity numerous Bosnian folk songs, sevdalinka.
