= Stojan Župljanin =

Stojan Župljanin (Serbian Cyrillic: Стојан Жупљанин; born 28 September 1951) is a former Bosnian Serb police commander.

Župljanin was born in Maslovare, a village in the Kotor Varoš municipality in Bosnia and Herzegovina. As commander of the Bosnian Serb police during the Bosnian war, Župljanin had operational control over the police forces responsible for the detention camps where thousands of prisoners were held in horrific conditions and many were murdered. Župljanin is also alleged to have played a central role in the destruction of Bosniak and Bosnian Croat communities in the Autonomous Region of Krajina.

On 14 March 1999 he was charged by the ICTY with genocide, crimes against humanity, violations of the laws and customs of war and breaches of the Geneva Conventions.

In October 2005, Župljanin's home was raided by local police and by EU peacekeepers, but they failed to find him. He was arrested on 11 June 2008 not far from Belgrade, Serbia and extradited to the ICTY, where he pleaded not guilty to all charges.

On 27 March 2013, Župljanin was convicted for crimes against humanity and sentenced to 22 years in jail by the war crimes tribunal in The Hague.

== Indictment ==
Under the terms of the indictment, Stojan Zupljanin is charged on the basis of his individual criminal responsibility (Art. 7 § 1 ICTY Statute) and on the basis of his criminal responsibility as hierarchical superior (Art. 7 § 3 ICTY Statute) for:

Two counts of genocide (Art. 4 ICTY Statute):

- genocide and complicity in genocide.

Five counts of crimes against humanity (Art. 5 ICTY Statute):

- persecutions
- extermination
- torture
- expulsion
- inhumane acts (forcible transfer).

Two counts of violations of the laws or customs of war (Art. 3 ICTY Statute):

- wanton destruction or devastation of towns or villages not justified by military necessity,
- destruction or willful damage done to institutions dedicated to religion.

Three counts of serious violations of the Geneva Conventions of 1949 (Art. 2 ICTY Statute):

- willful murder,
- torture,
- the appropriation or plunder of property not justified by military necessity and carried out on a large scale and in an illicit and arbitrary manner.
