= Milomir Stakić =

Bosnian Serb (born 1962)

Milomir Stakić (born 19 January 1962 in Marićka, Prijedor, Bosnia and Herzegovina) is a Bosnian Serb who was charged with genocide, complicity in genocide, violations of the customs of war and crimes against humanity by the International Criminal Tribunal for the Former Yugoslavia (ICTY) for his actions in the Prijedor region during the Bosnian War.

In the 1991 elections he became Vice-President of the Prijedor Municipal Assembly as a member of the Serbian Democratic Party. He soon established a parallel Serb shadow government in the region. He faced eight charges in all, ranging from genocide and extermination, to deportation and persecution in the form of destroying local villages as well as mosques and Catholic churches. He was eventually found guilty of five charges, and acquitted of three counts of genocide. The court ruled: "Despite the comprehensive pattern of atrocities against non-Serbs in Prijedor, the trial chamber has not found this to be a case of genocide, rather it is a case of persecution, deportation and extermination." He was sentenced to life imprisonment, which was later reduced to forty years through the appeals process. The appeals court stated his original sentence was inappropriate, while still upholding his conviction for the extermination and prosecution of non-Serbs in Prijedor and his acquittal on charges of genocide. They stated the evidence was consistent with the conclusion that he intended to displace but not destroy non-Serbs.

The former Minister of Justice of Serbia, Aranđel Markićević, responded to his extradition by saying that it was done in an illegal and unconstitutional manner. In January 2007 he was transferred to France to serve his sentence of 40 years' imprisonment. At least until April 2011 "Mr Stakić did not co-operate with the Prosecution in the course of his trial, appeal, or enforcement of his sentence." In July 2011 the court "declines to grant Mr. Milomir Stakić sentence remission." In December 2021 he was given a ten-month reduction in his sentence in pursuance of the law in France, according to Judge Carmel Agius. However, the reduction was not considered in two-thirds of the 40-year sentence needed for early release, and Stakić's appeals have been turned down for granting early release based on the two-thirds rule.

== See also ==
- Bosnian War
- International Criminal Tribunal for the Former Yugoslavia
- Omarska camp
- Prijedor ethnic cleansing
