= 1992 ethnic cleansing of central Bosanska Krajina =

- Part of Bosnian War
- Location: 44.7682°N 17.1877°E central Bosanska Krajina, Bosnia and Herzegovina
- Date: May to July 1992
- Target: Bosniaks and Croats
- Attack type: shelling, infantry attacks, murder, destroying houses, looting
- Weapon: military weapons
- Perpetrator: Bosnian Serb Army
- Motive: expulsion of Bosnian Muslims and Croats from the central part of the region

The 1992 ethnic cleansing of central Bosanska Krajina occurred between May and July 1992, the Bosnian Serb Army systematically ethnically cleansed the central part of the Bosanska Krajina region of Bosnia and Herzegovina, including the towns of Sanski Most, Prijedor and Ključ. This incorporated some of the worst atrocities to occur during the Bosnian War.

== Background ==
In April 1992 the Bosnian War widened, and in mid-April the leadership of the Serb Democratic Party (SDS) in the self-proclaimed Bosanska Krajina Autonomous Region took action to assert Bosnian Serb control over key cities and towns within the region that still had Bosnian Muslim- or Bosnian Croat-controlled local government or police. Their main focus was on the large towns along the Sana River valley, Sanski Most, Prijedor and Ključ. All three had large populations of Bosnian Muslims, and they were the largest single ethnic group in the first two towns.

Between 15 and 20 April, the Yugoslav People's Army (JNA) 6th Partisan Brigade returned to its barracks in Sanski Most from a deployment to the self-proclaimed Croatian Serb-controlled Western Slavonia Autonomous Region. The brigade seized control of key administrative buildings and infrastructure, including the police headquarters, radio station and power station. SDS officials took over the local government, the police were absorbed into the new Bosnian Serb Ministry of Internal Affairs, and all Bosnian Muslim and Croat members of the police were expelled. About two weeks later, the SDS seized power in Prijedor along similar lines, backed by the JNA 343rd Motorised Brigade. It is believed that the SDS takeover Ključ of occurred in April or possibly early May, almost certainly backed by the JNA 6th Partisan Brigade.

== Comparison of forces ==
During late 1991 and early 1992, as the Bosnian Serbs continued to declare autonomy from the central government of Bosnia and Herzegovina, Croats and Bosnian Muslims in the Sana valley began organising town self-defence groups or village guards against possible attacks from the Bosnian Serbs or their supporters in the JNA. These were often led or trained by Croat or Muslim men who had served in the JNA, or were reservists or officers or members of the Territorial Defence (TO), a kind of armed reserve gendarmerie in Yugoslavia. They were augmented by members of the newly organised paramilitary Patriotic League. Most were no more than untrained bands of civilians equipped with hunting weapons or a few World War II-era bolt-action M48 rifles. They had few anti-tank or heavy weapons, and some of the heavy weapons they had were defective ones bought from Serb black marketeers. Most of these armed men came from the villages near Prijedor, and it is unlikely that more than 500 were armed. Scattered across many villages, their capacity to concentrate and realistically oppose Bosnian Serb or JNA troops was very low.

By comparison, with the peace plan in Croatia being implemented, the JNA's 5th (Banja Luka) Corps withdrew its three combat brigades from the frontline in the Western Slavonia Autonomous Region, and returned to their garrisons in Prijedor and Sanski Most. There they were bolstered by reservists mobilised by the Second Military District on 5 April, and by Bosnian Serb members of the TO. The commander of the 5th Corps, Major General Momir Talić established a regional command led by Lieutenant Colonel Radmilo Željaja, the chief of staff of the 343rd Brigade, to oversee the TO headquarters and the security of the Sana valley. Željaja coordinated all his actions with the local SDS leadership. On 20 May, when the JNA formations in Bosnia and Herzegovina became the Bosnian Serb Army (VRS), the forces coordinated by Željaja may have totalled as many as 8,000, probably including former TO units and volunteer personnel. They included small numbers of armoured fighting vehicles and field artillery.

== Prijedor ==
On 20 May, two battalions of the now-VRS 5th Partisan Brigade and one battalion of the former JNA 343rd Motorised Brigade – renamed the VRS 43rd Brigade – were deployed to a staging area near the Muslim-majority town of Kozarac and its surrounding villages near the main road between Prijedor and the city of Banja Luka further west. At the same time, Željaja – now a lieutenant colonel in the VRS – ordered the predominantly Muslim villagers within a 10 km (6.2 mi) radius of Prijedor to turn in all weapons or face the consequences. The Bosnian Serbs and VRS in particular, claimed that this was necessary to eliminate the "threat" from the virtually non-existent Muslim "forces" in the area. On 22 May a VRS patrol clashed with village guards near the village of Hambarine. The following day, using the pretext of the patrol clash, VRS troops encircled Kozarac and neighbouring villages and shelled them in preparation for an infantry attack. Kozarac held out for four days, and caused several VRS casualties before the VRS numbers and armour prevailed. Following the seizure of the town, the VRS killed a large number of people, including women and children. Those remaining were herded into camps, and men aged between 18 and 60 years were segregated from the women, children and elderly. Hambarine fell more quickly.

In response to this, the Croat commander of a local Patriotic League element – Slavko Ećimović – pulled the remaining members of the local self-defence groups together immediately south of Prijedor and planned an attack on key Bosnian Serb-held installations in Prijedor. His objective in launching this attack is unclear, and it was near-suicidal given the imbalance of forces. It seems possible that he hoped that if he held the target buildings even for a short time, a mass uprising among the town's Muslim population might follow. It is also possible that he hoped to divert the VRS for long enough to allow the Bosnian Muslim people in the surrounded villages to escape into the forests and hills and make their way to government-held territory. In the early hours of 30 May, Ećimović led about 300 Patriotic League fighters in an attack on a hotel used as a barracks by the VRS, the police station, and the local government headquarters. They overran the hotel, killing a number of VRS soldiers, and captured a large number of small arms from the police station. No uprising occurred, and with VRS reinforcements arriving, the survivors withdrew, having held key parts of Prijedor for most of a day. VRS and police casualties totalled 14 killed and 26 wounded. The important result of the brief success of the attack was that the fears of the Bosnian Serb leadership about the threat from the Bosnian Muslims were almost certainly inflamed.

== Sanski Most and Ključ ==
On 25 May, the VRS 6th Partisan Brigade mortared the majority-Muslim Mahala suburb of Sanski Most. The following day, VRS soldier began rounding up the Bosnian Muslim population of the town, separating the men aged 18 to 60 from the rest and interning them, and transporting most of the women, children and elderly to the Muslim-controlled enclave of Bihać further to the west. In Ključ on the same day, two battalions of the 6th Partisan Brigade and a VRS engineer battalion, possibly with support from a battalion from the VRS 13th Partisan Brigade, began a series of brutal actions to ethnically cleanse villages north and north west of the town which continued until early June, and drove out or killed a large proportion of the rural Bosnian Muslim population from the area. The commander of the VRS 6th Partisan Brigade, Lieutenant Colonel Branko Basara admitted that units from his brigade "had been committing 'genocide' against Muslim noncombatants".

== Typical village ethnic cleansing ==
The ethnic cleansing of villages typically followed a standard pattern beginning with surrounding the village, then pounding it with indirect or direct fire to terrorise the population and dishearten any defenders. In many cases, women and children would flee into nearby forests at this stage. In most cases, VRS troops would enter the village the following day, and usually clear the village house-to-house, randomly killing villagers, burning houses and looting. After men aged 18 to 60 were separated from the other villagers and killed or shipped off to internment camps, the women and children were either sent to an internment camp or bussed to government-held frontlines near Travnik in central Bosnia. Then the remaining homes were destroyed by bulldozers, explosives or fire. In an example of these actions from Prhovo, a village about 7 km (4.3 mi) north east of Ključ, of a total population of around 150, 53 people were killed.

== Final ethnic cleansing actions ==
Some of the survivors of the ethnic cleansing campaign in central Bosanska Krajina escaped into the forests and mountains between Sanski Most and Prijedor. These included the survivors of the 30 May attack on Prijedor. They grouped together for protection, and some were armed. Those who were operated as guerillas and attacked VRS patrols and tried to help the remaining Bosnian Muslim people. The VRS viewed them as the last major threat to Bosnian Serb hegemony and mounted a major operation around 20 July which utilised most of the 5th Partisan Brigade, under Major Pero Čolić, and at least a battalion of the 43rd Motorised Brigade. They swept south from Prijedor towards Stara Rijeka. There, Colic's troops linked up with the 6th Partisan Brigade which moved north from Sanski Most through Stari Majdan. It appears to have gone basically as planned, a number of villages were destroyed, their populations expelled or killed, and the guerillas dispersed. This was the final ethnic cleansing action in the region, as the VRS began transferring units to battlefronts further east, which indicates that the supposed "threat" had been virtually eliminated, and local police could deal with any remaining armed Bosnian Muslims in the area.

== Analysis and aftermath ==
The Central Intelligence Agency history of the Balkan conflicts of the 1990s, Balkan Battlegrounds, states that the ethnic cleansing of the central Bosanska Krajina region was one of the "worst atrocities to occur during the Bosnian War". It assesses that the VRS ethnic cleansed the region because it considered the Bosnian Muslim population could pose an armed threat or fifth column during its war with government forces. They point to the VRS focus on seizing weapons and interning military age males as evidence for this. They further state that the Bosnian Serbs' paranoia greatly exaggerated the supposed threat, and that the sporadic guerilla attacks from survivors of the ethnic cleansing exacerbated their paranoia. The ethnic cleansing of the region consolidated Bosnian Serb control and moved it towards the Bosnian Serb aim of an ethnically pure state. They observe that reporting on the ethnic cleansing of the region has created some of the most lasting images of the Bosnian War, with the singling out of one ethnic group for death, torture and expulsion, alongside the photographs of internees at the Omarska camp resurrecting memories of the Nazi Holocaust. While the Bosnian Serbs' immediate political and military objectives may have achieved by the ethnic cleansing of the region, the reputational damage to Serbs was significant, and destroyed any sympathy they might have sought from the international community, and created a thirst for revenge among the Bosnian Muslims.

== War crimes ==
The following Bosnian Serbs were indicted by the International Criminal Tribunal for the former Yugoslavia (ICTY) for war crimes, crimes against humanity and/or violations of the laws or customs of war committed during the ethnic cleansing of central Bosanska Krajina:

- Momir Talić - first indicted 14 March 1999, arrested in Austria and transferred to the ICTY 25 August 1999, pleaded not guilty, died in custody 28 May 2003, proceedings terminated
- Radoslav Brđanin - first indicted 14 March 1999, arrested by SFOR and transferred to the ICTY 6 July 1999, pleaded not guilty, found guilty 1 September 2004, sentenced to 32 years imprisonment reduced to 30 years on appeal, transferred to serve sentence in Denmark, granted early release 3 September 2022, died in Banja Luka 7 September 2022
- Milan Kovačević - first indicted 13 March 1997, arrested by SFOR and transferred to ICTY 10 July 1997, pleaded not guilty, died in custody 1 August 1998, proceedings terminated
- Milomir Stakić - first indicted 13 March 1997, arrested by Serbian authorities 23 March 2001 and transferred to the ICTY, pleaded not guilty on all counts, found guilty 22 March 206, sentenced to life imprisonment reduced to 40 years imprisonment on appeal, transferred to serve sentence in France, still serving sentence as of February 2025
