= Duško Tadić =

Bosnian Serb criminal (born 1955)

- Душко Тадић
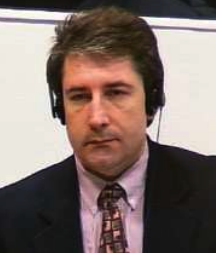
- Tadić at the ICTY
- Born: October 1, 1955 (age 71); Kozarac, SR Bosnia and Herzegovina, SFR Yugoslavia
- Other names: Dule; Dusan
- Occupation: Cafe owner
- Political party: SDS
- Movement: Republika Srpska
- Status: Released (2008)
- Criminal charges: Crimes against humanity, war crimes
- Penalty: 20 years imprisonment
- Wanted by: United Nations
- Accomplice: Goran Borovnica

Details
- Date apprehended: 1994
- Imprisoned at: United Nations Detention Unit; Stadelheim Prison

Duško Tadić (born 1 October 1955) is a former politician who was found guilty by the International Criminal Tribunal for the former Yugoslavia (ICTY) of persecution, murder, beatings and other violence, and forced transfer, as well as his participation in the attack on the town of Kozarac near Prijedor, Bosnia and Herzegovina, during the Bosnian War – constituting crimes against humanity and violations of the laws and customs of war. He was the first person to be found guilty by the ICTY. He was sentenced to 20 years of imprisonment.

== Early life and work ==
Duško Tadić was born on 1 October 1955 and grew up in the town of Kozarac within the Prijedor municipality, living mainly in the family home on Marshal Tito Street in the centre of the town. Of Bosnian Serb ethnicity, Duško's father was a decorated World War II veteran and was well respected in the town. During World War II Duško's mother had been interned in the infamous Jasenovac concentration camp run by the fascist and Croat ultranationalist and Ustasa-led Independent State of Croatia – an Axis puppet state. Duško and his three brothers were all experts in karate. In 1979 Duško unofficially married Mira Tadić from the neighboring village of Vidovići. The couple had two daughters. Their marriage was made official at some point after April 1981. In 1997, while they had been officially divorced for some years, apparently because Mira being officially single assisted her to gain employment outside Yugoslavia, they still considered themselves married.

Around the end of 1990 or the beginning of 1991, Duško Tadić opened the Nipon cafe, which was attached to the family home. Initially the cafe was popular with both Bosnian Serb and Bosnian Muslim residents of the town and surrounding area. Some ninety per cent of the residents of Kozarac itself were Bosnian Muslim, and the majority of Tadić's friends were Bosnian Muslims. Despite these associations, Tadić was in support of the idea of Greater Serbia, and as his nationalism grew, greater numbers of nationalist Serbs from Kozarac and the surrounding area began to frequent the cafe.

== Trial ==
Tadić was arrested by German police in Munich in February 1994. He faced twelve counts of crimes against humanity, twelve counts of grave breaches of the Geneva Conventions, and ten counts of violations of the customs of war, to all of which he pleaded not guilty. His trial was to be held together with Goran Borovnica's, but Borovnica went missing in 1995 and was later declared dead.

On 7 May 1997, the Trial Chamber II found Tadić guilty on 9 counts and partially guilty on 2 counts. Tadić and the prosecution appealed on a number of grounds. One of the arguments required the court to determine whether or not the court was legitimate in its exercise of jurisdiction. Tadić argued that the court was illegitimately created through the United Nations Security Council. His argument was based upon separation of powers. He essentially argued that the Security Council was an executive governmental branch and thus did not have the power to create a judicial body.

To resolve this argument, the court was forced to determine whether it was legitimately formed through the United Nations Security Council. The court's analysis began by determining if this was an issue of jurisdiction. It explained that this may not be a jurisdiction issue when jurisdiction is given a narrow definition. It then noted that a narrow definition of jurisdiction is not warranted in the international context. Thus it determined that Tadić's argument was one of jurisdiction.

Next, the court went on to determine whether it had the power to evaluate its own jurisdiction. In coming to a conclusion, the court explained that a tribunal, in the international context, must assert its own jurisdiction within the bounds of the council that forms it. Consequently, it determined that it doesn't have the power to determine the validity of its establishment by the security council.

A significant issue at trial was the use of protective measures for several witnesses, such as anonymity (including keeping their names from the defence), submission of evidence from a room separate from the courtroom, and the distortion of the voices and images. The majority of the Trial Chamber allowed this motion on the basis that the Tribunal had a duty 'to protect witnesses who are genuinely frightened'. However, Judge Stephen dissented, arguing that it was unreasonable to ask the defence to cross-examine a witness who amounted to a 'disembodied and distorted voice transmitted by electronic means.'

Another notable incident during the trial was the breach by the defence of the anonymity order with relation to Witness L, who revealed on cross-examination that he had lied about the death of his father and had been trained to give evidence at the Tribunal by the Bosnian government.

Upon Tadić's appeal of the ruling, he was found guilty of several more charges. In 2000, the ICTY found Tadić's lawyer, Milan Vujin, guilty of contempt of court. According to Tadić, Vujin was more interested in defending the interests of Serbia than of defending the interest of his client. This ruling had no outcome on the sentencing of Tadić. After serving his sentence until September 2000 in the Hague, he was transferred to a prison in Munich, Germany. He was granted early release from prison on 17 July 2008 and is living in Serbia.
