= Tomašica, Bosnia and Herzegovina =

Tomašica
- Village
- Location within Bosnia and Herzegovina
- Coordinates: 44.86°N 16.77°E
- Country: Bosnia and Herzegovina
- Entity: Republika Srpska
- Municipality: Prijedor

Population (1991)
  - Total: 908
- Time zone: UTC+1 (CET)
  - Summer (DST): UTC+2 (CEST)

Tomašica is a village in Bosnia and Herzegovina in the Prijedor municipality of the Republika Srpska entity.

== Mass grave ==
In August 2013, one of the larger primary mass grave sites from the Bosnian War was discovered by Bosnian authorities. Exhumation activities were assisted by forensic experts from the International Commission on Missing Persons (ICMP) and according to witnesses contain upwards of 1,000 Bosniak and Croat victims killed by Bosnian Serb forces. Initial media reports placed the number of remains at 360. Exhumations were postponed until spring due to winter weather, but experts are confident that the grave holds at least 850 bodies.

The International Criminal Tribunal for the former Yugoslavia (ICTY) gathered evidence from the area for possible use in prosecutions. Thus far 16 Bosnian Serbs have been sentenced by the ICTY to a sum of 230 years for war crimes committed in Tomašica's municipality of Prijedor. On November 25, 2013, Theodor Meron, president of the ICTY, visited the site and stated he was "face to face with horror".

Once the bodies from the grave site were found, they were taken to a mortuary to begin the ICMP's DNA laboratory system. At the end of the process, the bodies would ideally be returned to their families for proper burial. The process for identifying the exhumed bodies involves pathologists, mortuaries, autopsies, DNA laboratories, data-matching software, court orders, and much more.

=== Legal responses ===
In October 2014, the case of Ratko Mladić was reopened in order to incorporate newly found evidence from the Tomasica grave site. The Prosecution was then able to include six expert and seven fact witnesses, and documentary evidence. Prior to this decision, the Chamber had ruled that the Prosecution could not use evidence related to Tomasica.

Judges found that evidence from the Tomasica grave site held relevance. The Prosecution stated, "that the Material clarifies the organised and large-scale nature of killings in Prijedor, and the VRS's (Army of Republika Srpska) role therein."

In June 2015, at the trial of Ratko Mladić, the forensic director of the ICMP, Thomas Parsons, testified that investigators had exhumed 385 sets of remains from Tomašica, and that 211 further remains had been removed from the site and reburied at Jakarina Kosa at some point after the war, meaning that a total of 596 bodies had been buried at Tomašica in 1992.
