= Rizvanovici =

Coordinates: 44°58′30″N 16°39′37″E

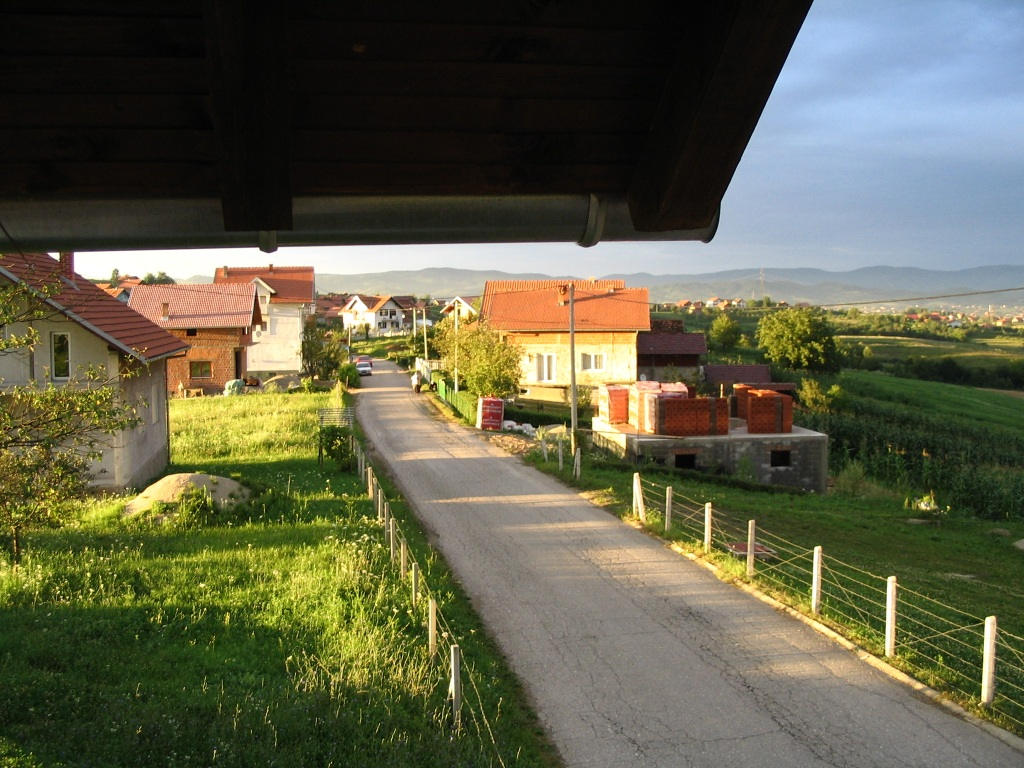
Rizvanovici

Rizvanovici ("Rizvanovići" in Bosnian) is a small village in the municipality of Prijedor, Bosnia and Herzegovina. It is on the left bank of river Sana about 5 kilometers southwest from the center of Prijedor.

The village had been completely devastated by the Bosnian Serb forces in 1995. Before that, in 1992, the civilian population has been expelled while the men had been either killed or taken away to concentration camps.

Rizvanovici had been largely rebuilt since the end of the war, but the return of refugees has been limited. A large number of men are still missing and identification of their remains is still ongoing.
