= Kozarac =

Kozarac Козарац
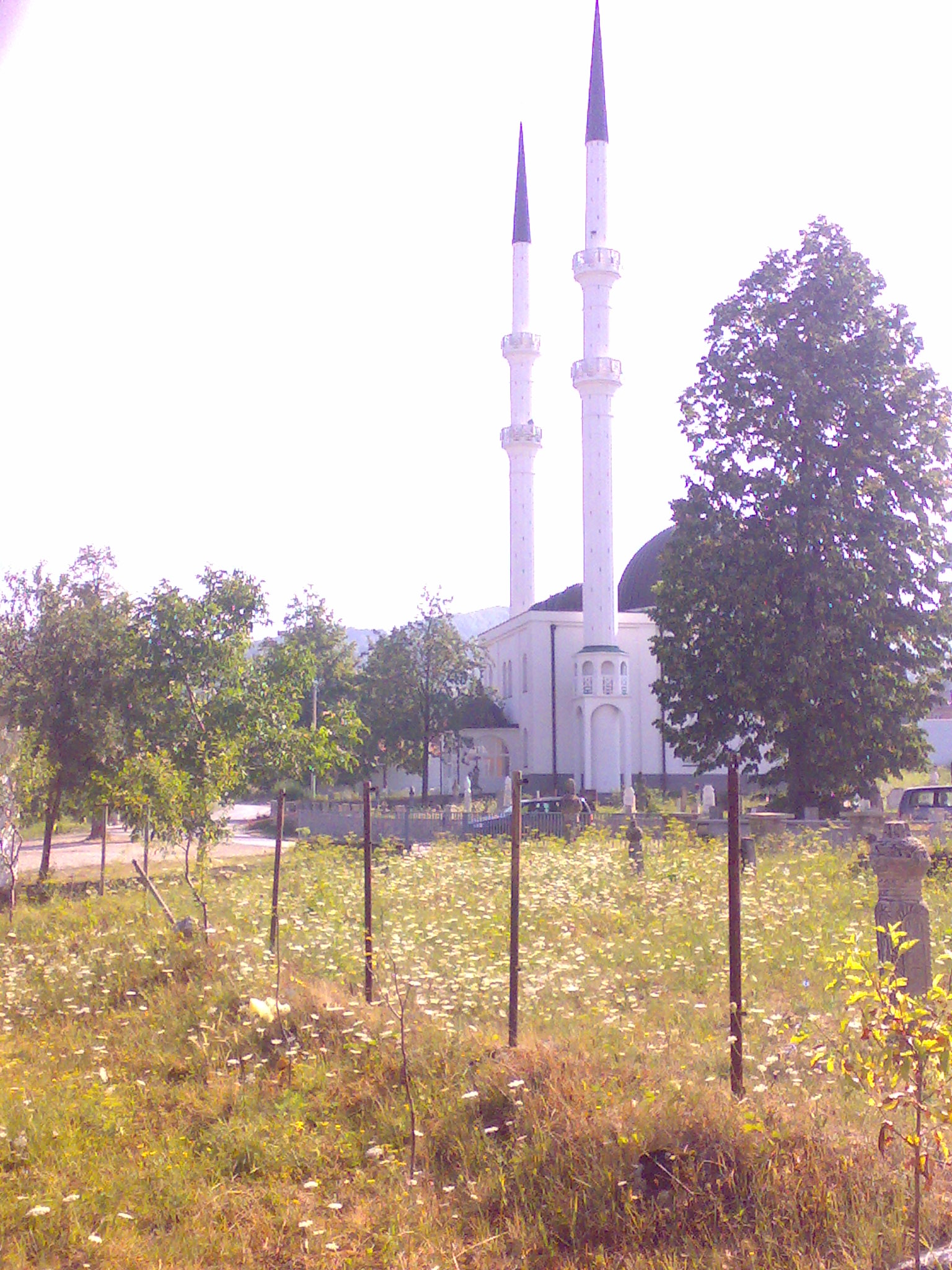
- Mutnik mosque in Kozarac
- Interactive map of Kozarac
- Country: Bosnia and Herzegovina
- Entity: Republika Srpska
- Region: Bosanska Krajina
- City: Prijedor

Population (2013)
  - Total: 4,397
- Time zone: UTC+1 (CET)
  - Summer (DST): UTC+2 (CEST)

Kozarac (Serbian Cyrillic: Козарац, pronounced [kɔ̂zarats]) is a town in north-western Republika Srpska, Bosnia and Herzegovina, located near the city of Prijedor. It is located 45 kilometres (28 mi) west of Banja Luka. Kozarac is also famous because of the Kozara National Park.

Kozarac has two public swimming pools, 14 mosques, 4 churchеs and a shopping mall. Every summer in Kozarac, famous musicians from across the whole of former Yugoslavia perform in the town.

== History ==
During the time of Yugoslavia, Kozarac had a population of 4,045. During the Bosnian War, the ethnic cleansing of Kozarac began on May 24, 1992. For three days, Kozarac was bombarded with shells and mortars. After a few hours of bombardment, Serb forces used loudspeakers to demand the surrender of the mainly Muslim population of Kozarac, promising them safety if they complied. However, when the civilian population complied, the shelling resumed, killing many of those who surrendered. The survivors fled back to their basements or into the hills. After 37 hours of bombardment, Serb forces once again demanded the surrender of the population, who complied once again.

With the help of a local Serb, the invading Serb forces identified the town's important Muslims, including the mayor, police chief, doctors, lawyers, judges, businessmen, and even athletes, and killed them either by shooting them or slitting their throats in a nearby house, effectively committing eliticide of the town. Between 2,500 and 3,000 mostly Bosniak civilians were killed by Serb forces in only 72 hours.

== Demographics ==
Ethnic Groups in Kozarac
Ethnic Group	1991	2013
Bosniaks (Muslims)	3,740 (92.46%)	4,306 (97.93%)
Serbs	96 (2.37%)	42 (0.96%)
Croats	35 (0.87%)	8 (0.18%)
Others	174 (4.30%)	41 (0.93%)
Total	4,045 (100.00%)	4,397 (100.00%)

== Notable people ==
- Duško Tadić, war criminal
- Eldin Jakupović, footballer
- Nedžad Mulabegović, athlete
- Vehid Gunić, journalist
- Fikret Hodžić, professional body builder
- Sakib Mahmuljin, war criminal

== References in popular culture ==
In the BBC drama series New Tricks episode 84 "Things Can Only Get Better", Hana Keranović, a suspect in the case, comes from Kozarac.
