= Predrag Banović =

Bosnian Serb war criminal

Predrag Banović (born 28 October 1969 in Prijedor, Bosnia and Herzegovina, Yugoslavia) is a Bosnian Serb who was charged with war crimes by the International Criminal Tribunal for the Former Yugoslavia (ICTY) for his actions at the Keraterm camp during the Bosnian War. He pleaded guilty to all charges in a bargain and was sentenced to serve eight years in prison, with credit for 716 days as time served.

Banović was arrested along with his twin brother, Nenad Banović, on 8 November 2001 in Serbia. He faced thirteen counts of crimes against humanity and twelve counts of violations of the laws of war. His case was processed along with those of Željko Meakić, Momcilo Gruban, Dušan Fuštar and Dušan Knežević and was referred to as "Omarska and Keraterm Camps". On 28 July 2004, Banović was transferred to France to serve his sentence in a French prison. On 3 September 2008, he was granted early release.

== See also ==
- Omarska camp
- Keraterm camp
