= Mlađo Radić =

Bosnian Serb war criminal (born 1952)

- Млађо Радић
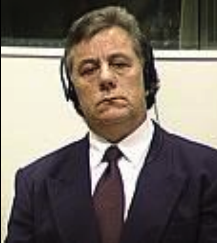
- Radić at the ICTY
- Born: 15 May 1952 (age 74); Lamovita near Prijedor in Bosnia and Herzegovina
- Occupation: police officer
- Years active: 1972–
- Employer: Prijedor municipal police
- Known for: war crimes and crimes against humanity
- Status: early release 31 December 2012
- Convictions: persecution, murder and torture (as crimes against humanity and violations of the laws and customs of war)
- Criminal charges: persecution, inhumane acts, outrages on personal dignity, murder, torture, cruel treatment and rape (as crimes against humanity and violations of the laws and customs of war)
- Penalty: 20 years' imprisonment
- Capture status: arrested by SFOR

Details
- Victims: Non-Serb detainees from the Prijedor region
- Span of crimes: May 1992 – August 1992
- Country: Bosnia and Herzegovina
- Location: Omarska concentration camp
- Date apprehended: 8 April 1998

Mlađo Radić (born 15 May 1952), sometimes known by the nickname Krkan, is a convicted war criminal and former policeman who was found guilty by the International Criminal Tribunal for the former Yugoslavia (ICTY) of persecution, murder and torture – constituting crimes against humanity and violations of the laws and customs of war – committed at the Omarska concentration camp in Prijedor, Bosnia and Herzegovina, during the Bosnian War.

Radić was born, raised and worked as a policeman in and around the town of Prijedor until late May 1992 when he began working at the Omarska camp which held almost exclusively non-Serb detainees from the surrounding districts who had been rounded up during the ethnic cleansing of central Bosanska Krajina. According to the trial and appeal judgements of the court, he became the leader of one of the guard shifts at the camp, and until the camp closed at the end of August 1992 he persecuted detainees on political, racial or religious grounds, a crime against humanity; murdered detainees, a violation of the laws and customs of war; and tortured detainees, a violation of the laws or customs of war. He was conscious of the discriminatory crimes that were committed against the detainees on a routine basis, ignored the bulk of the offences committed against detainees while he was on duty, raped a female detainee and attempted to rape a second female detainee, and was involved in the sexual intimidation, harassment, and assault of four other female detainees. He also accompanied detainees to offices for interrogation and removed them after they had been interrogated and beaten, and several detainees died from beatings inflicted by members of his shift. He failed to prevent outsiders from entering the camp to beat detainees, and personally committed acts of sexual violence that the court characterised as torture. The camp was closed in late August following international outcry in the wake of a visit and reporting by British journalist Ed Vulliamy.

Radić was indicted by the ICTY in February 1995 and arrested in Bosnia by British troops serving with the Stabilisation Force in April 1998, and transferred to the ICTY. He entered pleas of not guilty to all twelve counts under the indictment, and along with his co-accused Miroslav Kvočka, Milojica Kos, Zoran Žigić and Dragoljub Prcać was tried by the ICTY between 28 February 2000 and 2 November 2001. Radić was found guilty on four counts and sentenced to twenty years' imprisonment, with credit granted for time served. His four co-accused were also found guilty, but only Žigić received a longer sentence of imprisonment. His appeal was dismissed and his conviction and sentence were affirmed. Radić was transferred to France to serve his sentence. He submitted a request for review which was also rejected. Radić was granted early release on his second application, effective on 31 December 2012. As of 2023 his whereabouts were unknown.

== Early life ==
Mlađo Radić was born on 15 May 1952 in the village of Lamovita near Prijedor in Bosnia and Herzegovina. In 1972 he began work as a police officer in the Prijedor municipality, assigned to the station in the small town of Ljubija within the municipality. His principal tasks were traffic control, checking for drunk drivers and providing security for schools and banks. By the time the Bosnian War began he was married and had three children. In 1992 he was working at the police station in the village of Omarska within the municipality of Prijedor, and his direct supervisor was Željko Mejakić. Radić's wife, Bosiljka, worked in the canteen at the Ljubija iron ore strip mining operation outside the village of Omarska.

== Omarska concentration camp ==
In September 1991, as Yugoslavia continued to break up, several Bosnian Serb autonomous regions were proclaimed in Bosnia and Herzegovina, which then each established what was known as a crisis staff. Each crisis staff consisted of the leaders of the Bosnian Serb-dominated Serb Democratic Party (SDS), the local Yugoslav People's Army (JNA) commander, and Bosnian Serb police officials. Initially the Serb Autonomous Region of Krajina (ARK) did not include the Prijedor municipality – which incorporated the town itself and some outlying villages. Within the municipality the local government was run by the Bosnian Muslim-dominated Party of Democratic Action (SDA), which had a small majority. On 30 April 1992, the SDS, assisted by police and military forces, took over the town of Prijedor, and JNA soldiers occupied all the prominent institutions in the town. A local crisis staff was created, reporting to the ARK crisis staff in the city of Banja Luka 50 km (31 mi) to the east. Immediately after the Bosnian Serb takeover of the municipality, non-Serbs were targeted for abusive treatment. After the JNA became the Bosnian Serb Army (VRS) on 20 May, majority non-Serb villages in the Prijedor area were attacked by the VRS, and the population rounded up, although some fled. This occurred in Prijedor town itself on 30 May. Older men, and women and children were separated from men aged between 15 and 65, who were transported to the police station in Prijedor then bussed to either the Omarska or Keraterm concentration camps. The elderly men, women and children were generally taken to the Trnopolje concentration camp. All three camps were in the wider Prijedor municipality. Later in the summer, non-Serb community leaders who had not been rounded up initially were arrested, taken to the police station and beaten then sent to one of the camps.

The Omarska camp was situated at the Ljubija mine. Preparations for its operation began around 27 May, and it was officially established on 31 May by Simo Drljača, the chief of police in Prijedor and a member of the local crisis staff. Initially, the camp was intended to operate for about 15 days, but remained open until late August 1992. Every detainee was interrogated at least once, usually involving severe mental and physical abuse. According to the Bosnian Serb authorities, a total of 3,334 detainees were held at the camp for some time during its almost three month operation. Former detainees estimated that up to 3,000 people were held at any given time, and former camp workers stated that number exceeded 2,000. The bulk of the detainees were men, although 36 women were also detained in the camp, most of whom were well-known in the Prijedor community before the war. Some boys as young as 15 were held in the early days of the camp's operation. The detainees were almost all Bosnian Muslims or Bosnian Croats, with a few Bosnian Serbs held due to suspicions they had been collaborating with Bosnian Muslims.

While held at the camp, detainees were kept in inhumane conditions and there was a pervasive atmosphere of extreme mental and physical violence. Intimidation, extortion, beatings, and torture were commonplace. Events that provided regular opportunities for abuse of detainees included the arrival of new detainees, interrogations, mealtimes and use of the toilet facilities. Outsiders entered the camp and were allowed to assault the detainees at random as they chose. Murder was common. Deliberate brutality and appalling conditions were integral to daily life in the camp. The majority of the detainees were held in the largest building at the mine, known as the "hangar", which had been built to house the heavy mine trucks and machinery. While the eastern part of the building was an open area, on the western side of the hangar were two floors with over 40 separate rooms. The three other buildings were the administration building which housed detainees on the ground floor, and on the first floor there were a series of rooms used for interrogations, the administration of the camp, and the female detainees' sleeping quarters. A small garage was attached. There were also two smaller buildings, the "white house" and the "red house". Between the hangar and administration building was an L-shaped 30 m (98 ft) concrete strip known as the "pista". Detainees received an inadequate quantity of poor quality food that was often rotten or inedible, and most detainees lost 25–35 kg (55–77 lb) of body weight while held at the camp, and were often beaten while moving in or out of the eating area. They were also provided with an inadequate quantity of water. Detainees were often beaten while moving to and from the inadequate toilet facilities and instead soiled themselves. The conditions in the camp and the medical care provided were grossly inadequate. Interrogations were carried out regularly and in an inhumane and cruel manner, and created an atmosphere of violence and terror. Detainees held in the administration building, in the hangar, and on the pista, were repeatedly subjected to mental and physical violence. Detainees were frequently beaten and murdered in and around the red house and white house. Female detainees were subjected to various forms of sexual violence in the camp.

On 7 August 1992, the British journalist Ed Vulliamy reported on the shocking conditions in the Omarska and Trnopolje camps, having visited them in the preceding days at the invitation of the president of the self-proclaimed Bosnian Serb proto-state, Republika Srpska, Radovan Karadžić. The international outcry that arose from Vulliamy's reporting and photographs of emaciated detainees caused the Bosnian Serbs to close the Omarska camp soon after, although many of the detainees were just moved to other camps.

== Role and activities of Radić at Omarska camp ==
According to findings by the International Criminal Tribunal for the former Yugoslavia (ICTY) during Radić's trial and appeal, from around 28 May until the end of August 1992, Radić – known to the detainees as Krkan ("Croaky") – worked at the Omarska camp. When he reported for duty at the camp, Mejakić and Radić were the only active duty police officers working at the camp. Mejakić told Radić that his duties were to maintain security and prevent detainees from escaping. After initially being a guard in front of the garage, Mejakić then told him to work in the duty office on the first floor of the administration building, where he manned the radio transmitter and telephone. He would also sometimes stand guard looking through a window overlooking the pista. Radić was then a guard shift leader at the camp, with his shift comprising approximately 30 men who worked for 12 hours at a time. Radić had substantial control over the members of his shift, and used his authority to stop some crimes, while ignoring the bulk of offences committed against detainees while he was on duty. The guards on Radić's shift perpetrated a wide variety of abuses and mistreatment against the detainees, including murder and torture, and Radić never exercised his authority to stop them from committing such crimes, and by failing to do so, gave the guards of his shift a strong message of approval for their behaviour. His non-intervention condoned, encouraged, and contributed to the commission and continuation of crimes against detainees.

The court found that Radić, in his role as guard shift leader, was exposed on a daily basis to killings, tortures, and other abuses committed in the camp against non-Serb detainees. He was well aware of the severe physical and mental violence routinely inflicted on detainees for discriminatory purposes, and was directly responsible for a number of these abuses. These included the rape of one female detainee, the attempted rape of another, and sexual violence against four women, with all these assaults also constituting torture. Radić did not remain at his post reluctantly, never missed a shift, and participated in crimes without hesitation. His contribution to the maintenance and functioning of the camp was knowing and substantial, and he willingly and intentionally contributed to the joint criminal enterprise to persecute and otherwise abuse the non-Serb detainees, and physically perpetrated a number of serious crimes. The guards on Radić's shift committed crimes particularly perversely and ruthlessly.

After the camp closed at the end of August 1992, Radić returned to police duties in Prijedor. In 1994, he was promoted to shift leader in the Prijedor municipal police so he could receive better retirement benefits, and in 1995 he was promoted to senior sergeant. Following the war he received an award for twenty years' service in the police.

== Indictment, arrest, trial and sentencing ==
In 1993, the ICTY was established by the United Nations (UN) to prosecute war crimes that took place in the Balkans in the 1990s. On 10 February 1995, Radić, along with 18 other persons allegedly involved in the running of the Omarska camp, was indicted by the Prosecutor of the International Criminal Tribunal for the former Yugoslavia (ICTY), Richard Goldstone. The indictments were reviewed and confirmed by Judge Adolphus Karibi-Whyte of the court three days later. On 20 December 1995, following the signing of the Dayton Agreement, the UN Protection Force in Bosnia and Herzegovina was replaced by the North Atlantic Treaty Organisation (NATO)-led multi-national peace enforcement operation known as the Implementation Force (IFOR). Once the peace agreement had been implemented, IFOR gave way in turn to the NATO-led Stabilisation Force (SFOR) on 20 December 1996. On 8 April 1998, Radić was arrested in Bosnia by British troops serving with SFOR, and was transferred to the ICTY the following day. He made his first appearance before the court on 14 April 1998 when he entered pleas of not guilty to all charges against him. On 31 May 1999, the indictment relating to Radić was amended to encompass only the prosecutions of Miroslav Kvočka, Milojica Kos, Radić, and Zoran Žigić, and proceedings regarding other persons allegedly involved in the running of the Omarska camp were dealt with separately.

The amended indictment on which Radić was tried comprised the following counts against him:

- Count 1 – Persecutions on political, racial or religious grounds, a crime against humanity
- Count 2 – Inhumane acts, a crime against humanity
- Count 3 – Outrages upon personal dignity, a violation of the laws or customs of war
- Count 4 – Murder, a crime against humanity
- Count 5 – Murder, a violation of the laws or customs of war
- Count 8 – Torture, a crime against humanity
- Count 9 – Torture, a violation of the laws or customs of war
- Count 10 – Cruel treatment, a violation of the laws or customs of war
- Count 14 – Torture, a crime against humanity
- Count 15 – Rape, a crime against humanity
- Count 16 – Torture, a violation of the laws or customs of war
- Count 17 – Outrages upon personal dignity, a violation of the laws or customs of war

On 28 February 2000, the trial commenced before judges Almiro Rodrigues (presiding), Fouad Riad and Patricia Wald, and during the trial Toma Fila was Radić's defence counsel. An adjournment was ordered on 6 March 2000 after Radić's co-accused Dragoljub Prcać had been arrested in Bosnia by SFOR the previous day. On 2 May 2000, the trial resumed after the prosecution of Prcać had been joined to the case. The trial was held over 113 days, and 50 witnesses gave evidence for the prosecution, and Radić's defence counsel called 22 witnesses. There were 305 prosecution exhibits and Radić's defence counsel produced 35 exhibits. Radić filed a motion for acquittal in accordance with ICTY rules on 6 November 2000, and the motion was heard on 28 November. On 15 December 2000 the trial chamber acquitted him of charges concerning Keraterm and Trnopolje camps, as the list of his victims concerned only detainees at Omarska. He was also acquitted of charges relating to nine individuals. Closing arguments were presented from 16 to 19 July 2001, and judgement was delivered on 2 November 2001. Radić was found guilty on Counts 1 (persecutions), 5 (murder), 9 (torture) and 16 (torture) of the indictment, the remaining counts were dismissed, and he was sentenced to twenty years' imprisonment. Radić was given credit for time served since 8 April 1998. His four co-accused were also found guilty, but only Žigić received a longer sentence of imprisonment.

== Appeal and request for review ==
On 15 November 2001, Radić filed a notice of general appeal of both his conviction and the sentence received. These were on the grounds of: the doctrine of JCE and the manner in which it was pleaded; the right to a fair and impartial trial; his criminal liability for the crime of persecutions; and alleged factual errors. He was again represented by Fila. On 28 February 2005 the appeals chamber of the ICTY, with Judge Mohamed Shahabuddeen as the presiding member, handed down its decision, affirming Radić's conviction and sentence. Radić was transferred to France on 15 November 2005 to serve his sentence, and was imprisoned at the Bapaume Detention Centre. on 27 February 2006, Radić's defence requested a review of the appeal judgement, in particular regarding Radić's rape of a detainee constituting torture, and requesting a corresponding reduction in his sentence. The request was rejected in its entirety by the appeals chamber of the ICTY, with Judge Fausto Pocar as the presiding member, on 31 October 2006.

== Applications for early release and eventual release ==
On 10 April 2007, French authorities advised the ICTY that Radić was eligible for commutation of his sentence under French law. On 22 June 2007 Pocar, as President of the ICTY, denied Radić any commutation of his sentence on that basis, after considering the gravity of his crimes, the treatment of similarly situated prisoners, evidence of lack of rehabilitation, and cooperation with the prosecution. On 13 May 2009, Radić filed an application for early release because the length of his sentence served became at least equal to his sentence remaining to be served, and under the French Criminal Code this made him eligible for early release. His application was rejected on 23 April 2010 by the President of the ICTY, Judge Patrick Lipton Robinson, who applied the general rule of the ICTY that prisoners were only eligible for release after two-thirds of their sentence had been served. He also noted that Radić was continuing to deny the crimes for which he was convicted – particularly those of rape and sexual assault, was continuing to make racist remarks, and was claiming that "the shelling of Sarajevo was organised by the UN so that the Serbs would be accused". On 14 June 2011 Radić filed an application for early release on the basis that he had served two-thirds of his sentence as of 9 August 2011 – a total of thirteen years and four months. In assessing the application, the President of the ICTY, Judge Theodor Meron, observed that Radić had not been able to adjust to the conditions of his detention in France, had not attempted to learn the language, and there was little to no evidence of his rehabilitation. On 13 February 2012 Meron denied immediate release, but granted it effective 31 December 2012. A 2023 study of the lives of war criminals from the 1990s Balkan conflicts who had been released having served their sentences was unable to find any information regarding Radić's whereabouts, but it was assumed that he had not been in the public eye, as his presence would have been reported in the media.
