= Dragoljub Prcać =

Bosnian Serb war criminal (born 1937)

- Драгољуб Прцаћ
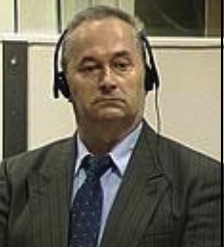
- Prcać at the ICTY
- Born: July 18, 1937; Omarska near Prijedor, Yugoslavia
- Died: March 6, 2022 (aged 84); Prijedor, Republika Srpska, Bosnia and Herzegovina
- Occupation: police officer
- Years active: 1968–1984, 1992–1995
- Employer(s): Yugoslav Public Security Service and Bosnian Serb police
- Known for: war crimes and crimes against humanity
- Status: early release 3 March 2005
- Convictions: persecution, murder and torture (as crimes against humanity and violations of the laws and customs of war)
- Criminal charges: persecution, inhumane acts, outrages on personal dignity, murder, torture, cruel treatment and rape (as crimes against humanity and violations of the laws and customs of war)
- Penalty: Five years' imprisonment
- Capture status: arrested by SFOR

Details
- Victims: Non-Serb detainees from the Prijedor region
- Span of crimes: 15 June 1992 – 6 August 1992
- Country: Bosnia and Herzegovina
- Location: Omarska concentration camp
- Date apprehended: 5 March 2000

Dragoljub Prcać (18 July 1937 - 6 March 2022) was a convicted war criminal and former policeman who was found guilty by the International Criminal Tribunal for the former Yugoslavia (ICTY) of persecution, murder and torture – constituting crimes against humanity and violations of the laws and customs of war – committed at the Omarska concentration camp in Prijedor, Bosnia and Herzegovina, during the Bosnian War.

Prcać was born and raised in and around the town of Prijedor until late May 1992 when he began working at the Omarska camp which held almost exclusively non-Serb detainees from the surrounding districts who had been rounded up during the ethnic cleansing of central Bosanska Krajina. He was the administrative aide to the camp commander, Željko Mejakić. Between 15 July until 6 August 1992, he persecuted detainees on political, racial or religious grounds, a crime against humanity; murdered detainees, a violation of the laws and customs of war; and tortured detainees, a violation of the laws or customs of war. He knew that a many different severe physical and mental crimes of violence were being inflicted on the non-Serb detainees at the camp on a routine basis to threaten and terrorise them, and was well aware of the discriminatory context in which these crimes occurred. Despite this knowledge, he continued to work in the camp for at least 22 days, where he performed the tasks required of him efficiently, effectively, all while being indifferent to the suffering of the detainees. The camp was closed in late August following international outcry in the wake of a visit and reporting by British journalist Ed Vulliamy.

Prcać was indicted by the ICTY in February 1995 and arrested in Bosnia by British troops serving with the Stabilisation Force in March 2000, and transferred to the ICTY. He entered pleas of not guilty to all eight counts under the indictment, and along with his co-accused Miroslav Kvočka, Milojica Kos, Mlađo Radić, and Zoran Žigić was tried by the ICTY between 2 May 2000 and 2 November 2001. Prcać was found guilty on three counts and sentenced to five years' imprisonment, with credit granted for time served. His four co-accused were also found guilty, and two others received significantly longer sentences. He appealed both his conviction and sentence but his appeals were dismissed. On 3 March 2005, following an application to the tribunal, he was released early from the ICTY Detention Unit in the Hague.

He died on 6 March 2022 in Prijedor.

== Early life and career ==
Dragoljub Prcać was born on 18 July 1937 in the village of Omarska near Prijedor in Bosnia and Herzegovina. He was an ethnic Serb. From 1960 to 1968, he was a policeman in Pula, Zagreb and on Brioni Island in the Adriatic Sea, working for the Yugoslav Public Security Service. From 1 January 1969 to his retirement on 31 December 1984 he was a crime scene technician in Poreč in Istria and in Prijedor. Following his retirement, Prcać lived on his pension and was a farmer, assisted by his wife and three children. On 29 May 1992, he was mobilised to work in the Omarska police station as a crime scene technician. He was demobilised on 31 December 1995.

== Omarska concentration camp ==
In September 1991, as Yugoslavia continued to break up, several Bosnian Serb autonomous regions were proclaimed in Bosnia and Herzegovina, which then each established what was known as a crisis staff. Each crisis staff consisted of the leaders of the Bosnian Serb-dominated Serb Democratic Party (SDS), the local Yugoslav People's Army (JNA) commander, and Bosnian Serb police officials. Initially the Serb Autonomous Region of Krajina (ARK) did not include the Prijedor municipality – which incorporated the town itself and some outlying villages. Within the municipality the local government was run by the Bosnian Muslim-dominated Party of Democratic Action (SDA), which had a small majority. On 30 April 1992, the SDS, assisted by police and military forces, took over the town of Prijedor, and JNA soldiers occupied all the prominent institutions in the town. A local crisis staff was created, reporting to the ARK crisis staff in the city of Banja Luka 50 km (31 mi) to the east. Immediately after the Bosnian Serb takeover of the municipality, non-Serbs were targeted for abusive treatment. After the JNA became the Bosnian Serb Army (VRS) on 20 May, majority non-Serb villages in the Prijedor area were attacked by the VRS, and the population rounded up, although some fled. This occurred in Prijedor town itself on 30 May. Older men, and women and children were separated from men aged between 15 and 65, who were transported to the police station in Prijedor then bussed to either the Omarska or Keraterm concentration camps. The elderly men, women and children were generally taken to the Trnopolje concentration camp. All three camps were in the wider Prijedor municipality. Later in the summer, non-Serb community leaders who had not been rounded up initially were arrested, taken to the police station and beaten then sent to one of the camps.

The Omarska camp was situated at the Ljubija mine. Preparations for its operation began around 27 May, and it was officially established on 31 May by Simo Drljača, the chief of police in Prijedor and a member of the local crisis staff. Initially, the camp was intended to operate for about 15 days, but remained open until late August 1992. Every detainee was interrogated at least once, usually involving severe mental and physical abuse. According to the Bosnian Serb authorities, a total of 3,334 detainees were held at the camp for some time during its almost three month operation. Former detainees estimated that up to 3,000 people were held at any given time, and former camp workers stated that number exceeded 2,000. The bulk of the detainees were men, although 36 women were also detained in the camp, most of whom were well-known in the Prijedor community before the war. Some boys as young as 15 were held in the early days of the camp's operation. The detainees were almost all Bosnian Muslims or Bosnian Croats, with a few Bosnian Serbs held due to suspicions they had been collaborating with Bosnian Muslims.

While held at the camp, detainees were kept in inhumane conditions and there was a pervasive atmosphere of extreme mental and physical violence. Intimidation, extortion, beatings, and torture were commonplace. Events that provided regular opportunities for abuse of detainees included the arrival of new detainees, interrogations, mealtimes and use of the toilet facilities. Outsiders entered the camp and were allowed to assault the detainees at random as they chose. Murder was common. Deliberate brutality and appalling conditions were integral to daily life in the camp. The majority of the detainees were held in the largest building at the mine, known as the "hangar", which had been built to house the heavy mine trucks and machinery. While the eastern part of the building was an open area, on the western side of the hangar were two floors with over 40 separate rooms. The three other buildings were the administration building which housed detainees on the ground floor, and on the first floor there were a series of rooms used for interrogations, the administration of the camp, and the female detainees' sleeping quarters. A small garage was attached. There were also two smaller buildings, the "white house" and the "red house". Between the hangar and administration building was an L-shaped 30 m (98 ft) concrete strip known as the "pista". Detainees received an inadequate quantity of poor quality food that was often rotten or inedible, and most detainees lost 25–35 kg (55–77 lb) of body weight while held at the camp, and were often beaten while moving in or out of the eating area. They were also provided with an inadequate quantity of water. Detainees were often beaten while moving to and from the inadequate toilet facilities and instead soiled themselves. The conditions in the camp and the medical care provided were grossly inadequate. Interrogations were carried out regularly and in an inhumane and cruel manner, and created an atmosphere of violence and terror. Detainees held in the administration building, in the hangar, and on the pista, were repeatedly subjected to mental and physical violence. Detainees were frequently beaten and murdered in and around the red house and white house. Female detainees were subjected to various forms of sexual violence in the camp.

On 7 August 1992, the British journalist Ed Vulliamy reported on the shocking conditions in the Omarska and Trnopolje camps, having visited them in the preceding days at the invitation of the president of the self-proclaimed Bosnian Serb proto-state, Republika Srpska, Radovan Karadžić. The international outcry that arose from Vulliamy's reporting and photographs of emaciated detainees caused the Bosnian Serbs to close the Omarska camp soon after, although many of the detainees were just moved to other camps.

== Role and activities of Prcać at Omarska camp ==
According to judicial findings by the International Criminal Tribunal for the former Yugoslavia (ICTY) during Prcać's trial and appeal, from around 15 July until 6 August 1992, Prcać worked at the Omarska camp as the administrative aide to the camp commander, Željko Mejakić. The trial chamber found that there was no doubt that Prcać was aware that a wide range of offences of severe physical and mental violence were being committed against the detainees at the Omarska camp on a routine basis in order to threaten and terrorise them, and that he was well aware of the discriminatory basis on which these crimes were being committed. Despite this knowledge, he continued to work in the camp for at least 22 days, where he performed the task required of him efficiently, effectively, and indifferently. He knowing and intentionally contributed to the furtherance of the joint criminal enterprise (JCE) constituted by the camp's operation, and was a co-perpetrator of the JCE.

== Indictment, arrest, trial and sentencing ==
In 1993, the ICTY was established by the United Nations (UN) to prosecute war crimes that took place in the Balkans in the 1990s. On 10 February 1995, Prcać, along with 18 other persons allegedly involved in the running of the Omarska camp, was indicted by the Prosecutor of the International Criminal Tribunal for the former Yugoslavia (ICTY), Richard Goldstone. The indictments were reviewed and confirmed by Judge Adolphus Karibi-Whyte of the court three days later. On 20 December 1995, following the signing of the Dayton Agreement, the UN Protection Force in Bosnia and Herzegovina was replaced by the North Atlantic Treaty Organisation (NATO)-led multi-national peace enforcement operation known as the Implementation Force (IFOR). Once the peace agreement had been implemented, IFOR gave way in turn to the NATO-led Stabilisation Force (SFOR) on 20 December 1996. On 31 May 1999, the indictment relating to Prcać was amended to encompass only the prosecutions of Mlađo Radić, Milojica Kos, Miroslav Kvočka, and Zoran Žigić, and proceedings regarding other persons allegedly involved in the running of the Omarska camp, including Prcać, were dealt with separately.

On 5 March 2000, Prcać was arrested in Bosnia by British troops serving with SFOR, and was transferred to the ICTY the following day. He made his first appearance before the court on 10 March 2000 when he entered pleas of not guilty to all charges against him. The trial of Radić, Kos, Kvočka, and Žigić had commenced on 28 February 2000 before judges Almiro Rodrigues (presiding), Fouad Riad and Patricia Wald, but it was adjourned on 6 March 2000 after the ICTY became aware of Prcać's arrest. It resumed on 2 May 2000 after the prosecution of Prcać had been joined to the case. Prcać's defence counsel was Jovan Simić.

The operative indictment on which Prcać was tried comprised the following counts against him:

- Count 1 – Persecutions on political, racial or religious grounds, a crime against humanity
- Count 2 – Inhumane acts, a crime against humanity
- Count 3 – Outrages upon personal dignity, a violation of the laws or customs of war
- Count 4 – Murder, a crime against humanity
- Count 5 – Murder, a violation of the laws or customs of war
- Count 8 – Torture, a crime against humanity
- Count 9 – Torture, a violation of the laws or customs of war
- Count 10 – Cruel treatment, a violation of the laws or customs of war

He was also or alternatively charged with superior responsibility for crimes committed by subordinates. The trial was held over 113 days, and 50 witnesses gave evidence for the prosecution, and Prcać's defence counsel called 16 witnesses. There were 305 prosecution exhibits and Prcać's defence counsel produced 46 exhibits. On 6 November 2000, Prcać filed a motion for acquittal in accordance with ICTY rules, and a hearing on the matter was held on 28 November. On 15 December 2000 the trial chamber acquitted Prcać of charges concerning Keraterm and Trnopolje camps, as the list of Prcać's victims concerned only detainees at Omarska. He was also acquitted of charges relating to nine individuals. Closing arguments were presented from 16 to 19 July 2001, and judgement was delivered on 2 November 2001. Prcać was found guilty on Counts 1 (persecutions), 5 (murder), and 9 (torture) of the indictment, the remaining counts were dismissed, and he was sentenced to five years' imprisonment. He was given credit for time served from 5 March 2000. His four co-accused were also found guilty, with Žigić and Radić receiving significantly longer sentences of imprisonment.

== Appeal and early release ==
On 15 November 2001, Prcać filed a notice of general appeal of both his conviction and the sentence received. His appeal against his conviction was on five grounds: that his arguments had been accepted by the trial chamber and he should have been acquitted of all charges; the relationship between the operative indictment and the trial judgement; errors of fact and law; credibility of witnesses; and fair trial and equality of parties. He argued that his sentence was too severe, arguing that the trial chamber had failed to take a number of mitigating circumstances into account when determining his sentence. He was again represented by Simić. On 28 February 2005 all grounds of his appeal were dismissed and his sentence affirmed. He was granted early release effective 3 March 2005.

== Death ==
Prcać died in his native Prijedor, on 6 March 2022.
