= Milojica Kos =

Bosnian Serb war criminal (born 1963)

- Милојица Кос
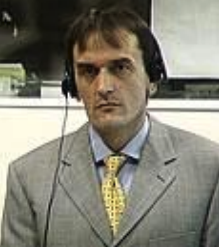
- Kos at the ICTY
- Born: 1 April 1963 (age 63); Lamovita near Prijedor in Bosnia and Herzegovina
- Known for: war crimes and crimes against humanity
- Status: early release 31 July 2002
- Convictions: persecution, murder and torture (as crimes against humanity and violations of the laws and customs of war)
- Criminal charges: persecution, inhumane acts, outrages on personal dignity, murder, torture, cruel treatment and rape (as crimes against humanity and violations of the laws and customs of war)
- Penalty: Six years' imprisonment
- Capture status: arrested by SFOR

Details
- Victims: Non-Serb detainees from the Prijedor region
- Span of crimes: 31 May 1992 – 6 August 1992
- Country: Bosnia and Herzegovina
- Location: Omarska concentration camp
- Date apprehended: 28 May 1998

Milojica Kos (born 1 April 1963), sometimes known by the nickname Krle ("Wings"), is a convicted war criminal and former policeman who was found guilty by the International Criminal Tribunal for the former Yugoslavia (ICTY) of persecution, murder and torture – constituting crimes against humanity and violations of the laws and customs of war – committed at the Omarska concentration camp in Prijedor, Bosnia and Herzegovina, during the Bosnian War.

Kos was born and raised in and around the town of Prijedor until late May 1992 when he began working at the Omarska camp which held almost exclusively non-Serb detainees from the surrounding districts who had been rounded up during the ethnic cleansing of central Bosanska Krajina. He became the leader of one of the 30-man guard shifts at the camp, and until 6 August 1992 he persecuted detainees on political, racial or religious grounds, a crime against humanity; murdered detainees, a violation of the laws and customs of war; and tortured detainees, a violation of the laws or customs of war. He knew of these abuses and the conditions within the Omarska camp, and had control and authority over the guards on his shift. He was personally involved in violent acts towards detainees and by his silence gave licence to the offences committed in his presence by others or by members of his shift. In mid-July 1992 he directly and personally beat detainees. The camp was closed in late August following international outcry in the wake of a visit and reporting by British journalist Ed Vulliamy.

Kos was indicted by the ICTY in February 1995 and arrested in Bosnia by British troops serving with the Stabilisation Force in May 1998, and transferred to the ICTY. He entered pleas of not guilty to all eight counts under the indictment, and along with his co-accused Mlađo Radić, Miroslav Kvočka, Zoran Žigić and Dragoljub Prcać was tried by the ICTY between 28 February 2000 and 2 November 2001. Kos was found guilty on three counts and sentenced to six years' imprisonment, with credit granted for time served. His four co-accused were also found guilty, and two others received significantly longer sentences. He appealed but withdrew it six months later, and was granted early release from the ICTY Detention Unit in the Hague on 31 July 2002. As of 2023 his whereabouts were unknown.

== Early life ==
Milojica Kos was born on 1 April 1963 in the village of Lamovita near Prijedor in Bosnia and Herzegovina. He is an ethnic Serb, studied catering from 1981 and worked as a waiter until 6 May 1992 when he was mobilised as a reserve police officer at the Omarska police station within the Prijedor municipality. From 6 May to 8 November 1992 during the Bosnian War, he worked as a newly recruited and untrained reserve policeman.

== Omarska concentration camp ==
In September 1991, as Yugoslavia continued to break up, several Bosnian Serb autonomous regions were proclaimed in Bosnia and Herzegovina, which then each established what was known as a crisis staff. Each crisis staff consisted of the leaders of the Bosnian Serb-dominated Serb Democratic Party (SDS), the local Yugoslav People's Army (JNA) commander, and Bosnian Serb police officials. Initially the Serb Autonomous Region of Krajina (ARK) did not include the Prijedor municipality – which incorporated the town itself and some outlying villages. Within the municipality the local government was run by the Bosnian Muslim-dominated Party of Democratic Action (SDA), which had a small majority. On 30 April 1992, the SDS, assisted by police and military forces, took over the town of Prijedor, and JNA soldiers occupied all the prominent institutions in the town. A local crisis staff was created, reporting to the ARK crisis staff in the city of Banja Luka 50 km (31 mi) to the east. Immediately after the Bosnian Serb takeover of the municipality, non-Serbs were targeted for abusive treatment. After the JNA became the Bosnian Serb Army (VRS) on 20 May, majority non-Serb villages in the Prijedor area were attacked by the VRS, and the population rounded up, although some fled. This occurred in Prijedor town itself on 30 May. Older men, and women and children were separated from men aged between 15 and 65, who were transported to the police station in Prijedor then bussed to either the Omarska or Keraterm concentration camps. The elderly men, women and children were generally taken to the Trnopolje concentration camp. All three camps were in the wider Prijedor municipality. Later in the summer, non-Serb community leaders who had not been rounded up initially were arrested, taken to the police station and beaten then sent to one of the camps.

The Omarska camp was situated at the Ljubija mine. Preparations for its operation began around 27 May, and it was officially established on 31 May by Simo Drljača, the chief of police in Prijedor and a member of the local crisis staff. Initially, the camp was intended to operate for about 15 days, but remained open until late August 1992. Every detainee was interrogated at least once, usually involving severe mental and physical abuse. According to the Bosnian Serb authorities, a total of 3,334 detainees were held at the camp for some time during its almost three month operation. Former detainees estimated that up to 3,000 people were held at any given time, and former camp workers stated that number exceeded 2,000. The bulk of the detainees were men, although 36 women were also detained in the camp, most of whom were well known in the Prijedor community before the war. Some boys as young as 15 were held in the early days of the camp's operation. The detainees were almost all Bosnian Muslims or Bosnian Croats, with a few Bosnian Serbs held due to suspicions they had been collaborating with Bosnian Muslims.

While held at the camp, detainees were kept in inhumane conditions and there was a pervasive atmosphere of extreme mental and physical violence. Intimidation, extortion, beatings, and torture were commonplace. Events that provided regular opportunities for abuse of detainees included the arrival of new detainees, interrogations, mealtimes and use of the toilet facilities. Outsiders entered the camp and were allowed to assault the detainees at random as they chose. Murder was common. Deliberate brutality and appalling conditions were integral to daily life in the camp. The majority of the detainees were held in the largest building at the mine, known as the "hangar", which had been built to house the heavy mine trucks and machinery. While the eastern part of the building was an open area, on the western side of the hangar were two floors with over 40 separate rooms. The three other buildings were the administration building which housed detainees on the ground floor, and on the first floor there were a series of rooms used for interrogations, the administration of the camp, and the female detainees' sleeping quarters. A small garage was attached. There were also two smaller buildings, the "white house" and the "red house". Between the hangar and administration building was an L-shaped 30 m (98 ft) concrete strip known as the "pista". Detainees received an inadequate quantity of poor quality food that was often rotten or inedible, and most detainees lost 25–35 kg (55–77 lb) of body weight while held at the camp, and were often beaten while moving in or out of the eating area. They were also provided with an inadequate quantity of water. Detainees were often beaten while moving to and from the inadequate toilet facilities and instead soiled themselves. The conditions in the camp and the medical care provided were grossly inadequate. Interrogations were carried out regularly and in an inhumane and cruel manner, and created an atmosphere of violence and terror. Detainees held in the administration building, in the hangar, and on the pista, were repeatedly subjected to mental and physical violence. Detainees were frequently beaten and murdered in and around the red house and white house. Female detainees were subjected to various forms of sexual violence in the camp.

On 7 August 1992, the British journalist Ed Vulliamy reported on the shocking conditions in the Omarska and Trnopolje camps, having visited them in the preceding days at the invitation of the president of the self-proclaimed Bosnian Serb proto-state, Republika Srpska, Radovan Karadžić. The international outcry that arose from Vulliamy's reporting and photographs of emaciated detainees caused the Bosnian Serbs to close the Omarska camp soon after, although many of the detainees were just moved to other camps.

== Role and activities of Kos at Omarska camp ==
According to findings by the International Criminal Tribunal for the former Yugoslavia (ICTY) during Kos' trial and appeal, from around 31 May until 6 August 1992, Kos – known to the detainees as Krle ("Wings") – worked at the Omarska camp. Around 31 May, Željko Mejakić, the Omarska police commander, consulted one of his senior police officers, Miroslav Kvočka, about employing Kos as a shift commander at the newly established Omarska camp. When he reported for duty at the camp, Mejakić appointed him as a guard shift commander. He performed these duties adequately, giving instructions to guards and orders to female detainees assigned to work in the camp. On rare occasions he prevented guards from committing abuses against detainees, and therefore had control and authority over the men on his guard shift. He knew about the abuses and the conditions within the camp, and was without doubt fully aware that severe acts of physical and mental violence were being inflicted on detainees on a routine basis, and he was also conscious of the context of discrimination in which the crimes were committed. Despite this knowledge, he continued to work in the camp for over two months, where he performed the tasks required of him without complaint or hesitation. Kos was directly and personally involved in the beating of detainees around mid-July 1992. He was also involved in the extortion of detainees and the stealing of money from them, constituting harassment and part of the persecution of the detainees. As a guard shift commander he knowingly and intentionally contributed to the furtherance of the joint criminal enterprise (JCE) constituted by the camp's operation, and was a co-offender within the JCE. Kos completed duty at the camp on 6 August 1992. In 1993 he attended a training course for junior police recruits in Banja Luka, and then became a junior policeman with no rank.

== Indictment, arrest, trial and sentencing ==
In 1993, the ICTY was established by the United Nations (UN) to prosecute war crimes that took place in the Balkans in the 1990s. On 10 February 1995, Kos, along with 18 other persons allegedly involved in the running of the Omarska camp, was indicted by the Prosecutor of the International Criminal Tribunal for the former Yugoslavia (ICTY), Richard Goldstone. The indictments were reviewed and confirmed by Judge Adolphus Karibi-Whyte of the court three days later. On 20 December 1995, following the signing of the Dayton Agreement, the UN Protection Force in Bosnia and Herzegovina was replaced by the North Atlantic Treaty Organisation (NATO)-led multi-national peace enforcement operation known as the Implementation Force (IFOR). Once the peace agreement had been implemented, IFOR gave way in turn to the NATO-led Stabilisation Force (SFOR) on 20 December 1996. On 28 May 1998, Kos was arrested in Bosnia by British troops serving with SFOR, and was transferred to the ICTY the following day. He made his first appearance before the court on 2 June 1998 when he entered pleas of not guilty to all charges against him. On 31 May 1999, the indictment relating to Kos was amended to encompass only the prosecutions of Mlađo Radić, Kos, Kvočka, and Zoran Žigić, and proceedings regarding other persons allegedly involved in the running of the Omarska camp were dealt with separately.

The operative indictment on which Kos was tried comprised the following counts against him:

- Count 1 – Persecutions on political, racial or religious grounds, a crime against humanity
- Count 2 – Inhumane acts, a crime against humanity
- Count 3 – Outrages upon personal dignity, a violation of the laws or customs of war
- Count 4 – Murder, a crime against humanity
- Count 5 – Murder, a violation of the laws or customs of war
- Count 8 – Torture, a crime against humanity
- Count 9 – Torture, a violation of the laws or customs of war
- Count 10 – Cruel treatment, a violation of the laws or customs of war

He was also or alternatively charged with superior responsibility for crimes committed by subordinates. The trial before judges Almiro Rodrigues (presiding), Fouad Riad and Patricia Wald commenced on 28 February 2000, and during the trial Žarko Nikolić was Kos' defence counsel. On 6 March 2000 the trial was adjourned following the arrest of Kos' co-accused Dragoljub Prcać by SFOR in Bosnia the previous day. Prcać's prosecution was added to the case and the trial resumed on 2 May 2000. The trial was held over 113 days, and 50 witnesses gave evidence for the prosecution, and Kos' defence counsel called four witnesses. There were 305 prosecution exhibits and Kos' defence counsel produced 13 exhibits. On 6 November 2000, Kos filed a motion for acquittal in accordance with ICTY rules, and a hearing on the matter was held on 28 November. On 15 December 2000 the trial chamber acquitted Kos of charges concerning Keraterm and Trnopolje camps, as the list of his victims concerned only detainees at Omarska. He was also acquitted of charges relating to nine individuals. Closing arguments were presented from 16 to 19 July 2001, and judgement was delivered on 2 November 2001. Kos was found guilty on Counts 1 (persecutions), 5 (murder), and 9 (torture) of the indictment, the remaining counts were dismissed, and he was sentenced to six years' imprisonment. He was given credit for time served from 29 May 1998. The trial chamber noted that Kos was the youngest of the co-accused, was an inexperienced and untrained police officer at the time, and did not hold a position of high esteem within the community prior to taking up his duties at the Omarska camp. Due to this, they observed that it was unlikely that he would have been a role model for the guards on his shift and his silence would not have carried the same degree of complicity in encouraging or condoning crimes as the more experienced police officers among his co-accused. His four co-accused were also found guilty, with Žigić and Radić receiving significantly longer sentences of imprisonment.

== Appeal and early release ==
On 16 November 2001, Kos filed a notice of general appeal of both his conviction and the sentence received. He withdrew his appeal on 21 May 2002, and on 31 July 2002, Kos was granted early release. A 2023 study of the lives of war criminals from the 1990s Balkan conflicts who had been released having served their sentences was unable to find any information regarding Kos' whereabouts, but it was assumed that he had not been in the public eye, as his presence would have been reported in the media.
