= Miroslav Kvočka =

Bosnian Serb war criminal (born 1957)

- Мирослав Квочка
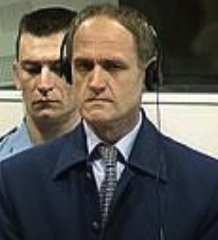
- Kvočka at the ICTY
- Born: 1 January 1957 (age 69); Mariĉka near Prijedor in Bosnia and Herzegovina
- Occupation: police officer
- Employer: Prijedor municipal police
- Known for: war crimes and crimes against humanity
- Status: early release 30 March 2005
- Convictions: persecution, murder and torture (as crimes against humanity and violations of the laws and customs of war)
- Criminal charges: persecution, inhumane acts, outrages on personal dignity, murder, torture, cruel treatment and rape (as crimes against humanity and violations of the laws and customs of war)
- Penalty: Seven years' imprisonment
- Capture status: arrested by SFOR

Details
- Victims: Non-Serb detainees from the Prijedor region
- Span of crimes: 29 May 1992 – 23 June 1992
- Country: Bosnia and Herzegovina
- Location: Omarska concentration camp
- Date apprehended: 8 April 1998

Miroslav Kvočka (born 1 January 1957) is a Bosnian Serb former policeman who was found guilty by the International Criminal Tribunal for the former Yugoslavia (ICTY) of persecution, murder and torture – constituting crimes against humanity and violations of the laws and customs of war – committed at the Omarska concentration camp in Prijedor, Bosnia and Herzegovina, during the Bosnian War.

Kvočka was born, raised and worked as a policeman in and around Prijedor. In late May 1992 he began working at the Omarska camp which held almost exclusively non-Serb detainees from the surrounding districts who had been rounded up during the ethnic cleansing of central Bosanska Krajina. According to findings during his trial and appeal, he was functionally the deputy commander of the camp guards. The court found that from 29 May until 23 June 1992 he persecuted detainees on political, racial or religious grounds, a crime against humanity; murdered detainees, a violation of the laws and customs of war; and tortured detainees, a violation of the laws or customs of war. Further, he knew about the discriminatory crimes regularly perpetrated within the camp, but despite this awareness, he ignored the bulk of the offences that occurred while he was on duty. He was not only present during the commission of crimes but, without doubt, was conscious of the routine infliction of severe physical and mental violence upon the detainees. The camp was closed in late August following international outcry in the wake of a visit and reporting by British journalist Ed Vulliamy.

Kvočka was indicted by the ICTY in February 1995 and arrested in Bosnia by troops serving with the Stabilisation Force in April 1998, and transferred to the ICTY. He entered pleas of not guilty to all twelve counts under the indictment, and along with his co-accused Mlađo Radić, Milojica Kos, Zoran Žigić and Dragoljub Prcać was tried by the ICTY between 28 February 2000 and 2 November 2001. Kvočka was found guilty on four counts and sentenced to seven years' imprisonment, with credit granted for time served. His four co-accused were also found guilty, and two others received significantly longer sentences. His appeal was dismissed, and his conviction and sentence were affirmed. He was granted early release from the ICTY Detention Unit in the Hague on 30 March 2005. As of 2023 he had returned to Prijedor, sold his house, and lived in a nearby village, taking on seasonal work. He had given several interviews and stated that he faced hardship and ostracism from the community.

== Early life ==
Before the Bosnian War, Kvočka lived in Omarska and had worked for twenty years as a police officer. By the time the war began in 1992, he was married to a Muslim woman, and was working at the police station in the village of Omarska within the municipality of Prijedor. His direct supervisor was Željko Mejakić, the commander of the Omarska police station.

== Omarska concentration camp ==
In September 1991, as Yugoslavia continued to break up, several Bosnian Serb autonomous regions were proclaimed in Bosnia and Herzegovina, which then each established what was known as a crisis staff. Each crisis staff consisted of the leaders of the Bosnian Serb-dominated Serb Democratic Party (SDS), the local Yugoslav People's Army (JNA) commander, and Bosnian Serb police officials. Initially the Serb Autonomous Region of Krajina (ARK) did not include the Prijedor municipality – which incorporated the town itself and some outlying villages. Before the war, the population of the municipality was 44 per cent Bosnian Muslim, 42.5 per cent Bosnian Serb, 5.6 per cent Bosnian Croat, with the rest identifying as Yugoslav, Ukrainian, Russian or Italian. Within the municipality the local government was run by the Bosnian Muslim-dominated Party of Democratic Action (SDA), which had a small majority. On 30 April 1992, the SDS, assisted by police and military forces, took over the town of Prijedor, and JNA soldiers occupied all the prominent institutions in the town. A local crisis staff was created, reporting to the ARK crisis staff in the city of Banja Luka 50 km (31 mi) to the east. Mejakić was appointed as the Omarska police commander during April, and shortly after that, immediately after the Bosnian Serb takeover of the municipality, non-Serbs were targeted for abusive treatment. After the JNA became the Bosnian Serb Army (VRS) on 20 May, majority non-Serb villages in the Prijedor area were attacked by the VRS, and the population rounded up, although some fled. This occurred in Prijedor town itself on 30 May. Older men, and women and children were separated from men of fighting age, who were transported to the police station in Prijedor then bussed to either the Omarska or Keraterm concentration camps. The elderly men, women and children were generally taken to the Trnopolje concentration camp. All three camps were in the wider Prijedor municipality. Non-Serb community leaders were included in the roundup and sent to one of the camps.

The Omarska camp was situated at the Ljubija iron ore mine. Preparations for its operation began around 25 May, and it was officially established on 31 May by Simo Drljača, the chief of police in Prijedor and a member of the local crisis staff. Initially, the camp was intended to operate for about 14 days, but remained open until the end of August 1992. Every detainee was interrogated at least once, usually involving severe mental and physical abuse. According to the Bosnian Serb authorities, a total of 3,334 detainees were held at the camp for some time during its almost three month operation, but other sources place the number around 5,000 to 7,000.The bulk of the detainees were men, although about 40 women were also detained in the camp, most of whom were well-known in the Prijedor community before the war. The detainees were almost all Bosnian Muslims or Bosnian Croats, with a few Bosnian Serbs held due to suspicions they had been collaborating with Bosnian Muslims.

While held at the camp, detainees were kept in deplorable conditions and there was a pervasive atmosphere of extreme mental and physical violence. Intimidation, extortion, beatings, and torture were commonplace. Events that provided regular opportunities for abuse of detainees included the arrival of new detainees, interrogations, mealtimes and use of the toilet facilities. Outsiders entered the camp and were allowed to assault the detainees at random as they chose. Murder was common. Deliberate brutality and appalling conditions were integral to daily life in the camp. The majority of the detainees were held in the largest building at the mine, known as the "hangar", which had been built to house the heavy mine trucks and machinery. While the eastern part of the building was an open area, on the western side of the hangar were two floors with many separate rooms. The three other buildings were the administration building which housed detainees on the ground floor, and on the first floor there were a series of rooms used for interrogations, the administration of the camp, and the female detainees' sleeping quarters. A small garage was attached. There were also two smaller buildings, the "white house" and the "red house". Between the hangar and administration building was an L-shaped 30 m (98 ft) concrete strip known as the "pista". Detainees received an inadequate quantity of poor quality food that was often rotten or inedible, and detainees experienced severe loss of weight while held at the camp, and were beaten while moving in or out of the eating area. They were also provided with an inadequate quantity of water which was often foul. Detainees were often beaten while moving to and from the inadequate toilet facilities and instead soiled themselves. The conditions in the camp and the medical care provided were grossly inadequate. Interrogations were carried out regularly and in an inhumane and cruel manner, and created an atmosphere of violence and terror. Detainees held in the administration building, in the hangar, and on the pista, were repeatedly subjected to mental and physical violence. Detainees were frequently beaten and murdered in and around the red house and the white house. Female detainees were subjected to various forms of sexual violence in the camp.

The Keraterm camp operated in a similar manner to the Omarska camp. Like Omarska, Keraterm only held a small number of female detainees, and most of the detainees were Bosnian Muslims, with a few Bosnian Croats. Overcrowding was severe, the conditions unhygienic, food and water inadequate. Most detainees were interrogated, detainees were beaten and sometimes killed with no apparent reason, and women were raped.

On 7 August 1992, the British journalist Ed Vulliamy reported on the shocking conditions in the Omarska and Trnopolje camps, having visited them in the preceding days at the invitation of the president of the self-proclaimed Bosnian Serb proto-state, Republika Srpska, Radovan Karadžić. The international outcry that arose from Vulliamy's reporting and photographs of emaciated detainees caused the Bosnian Serbs to close the Omarska camp soon after, although many of the detainees were just moved to other camps.

== Indictment, arrest, trial and sentencing ==
In 1993, the ICTY was established by the United Nations (UN) to prosecute war crimes that took place in the Balkans in the 1990s. On 20 December 1995, following the signing of the Dayton Agreement, the UN Protection Force in Bosnia and Herzegovina was replaced by the North Atlantic Treaty Organisation (NATO)-led multi-national peace enforcement operation known as the Implementation Force (IFOR). Once the peace agreement had been implemented, IFOR gave way in turn to the NATO-led Stabilisation Force (SFOR) on 20 December 1996.

The amended indictment on which Kvočka was tried comprised the following counts against him:

- Count 1 – Persecutions on political, racial or religious grounds, a crime against humanity
- Count 2 – Inhumane acts, a crime against humanity
- Count 3 – Outrages upon personal dignity, a violation of the laws or customs of war
- Count 4 – Murder, a crime against humanity
- Count 5 – Murder, a violation of the laws or customs of war
- Count 8 – Torture, a crime against humanity
- Count 9 – Torture, a violation of the laws or customs of war
- Count 10 – Cruel treatment, a violation of the laws or customs of war

Kvočka was found guilty on Counts 1 (persecution), 5 (murder), and 9 (torture) of the indictment; the remaining counts were dismissed, and he was sentenced to seven years' imprisonment. He was given credit for time served.

== Appeal, provisional release and final release ==
Kvočka was located in 2023 by a team conducting a study of the lives of war criminals from the 1990s Balkan conflicts who had been released after serving their sentences. He had returned to Prijedor, sold his house, and lived in a nearby village, taking on seasonal work. He had given several interviews and stated that he was facing hardship and ostracism from the community.
