= Zoran Žigić =

Bosnian Serb war criminal (born 1958)

- Зоран Жигић
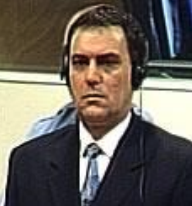
- Žigić at the ICTY
- Born: September 20, 1958 (age 68); Balte, Prijedor, SR Bosnia and Herzegovina, Yugoslavia
- Occupations: reserve police officer and taxi driver
- Known for: war crimes and crimes against humanity
- Status: early release 16 December 2014
- Convictions: persecution, murder, torture and cruel treatment (as crimes against humanity and violations of the laws and customs of war)
- Criminal charges: persecution, inhumane acts, outrages on personal dignity, murder, torture, cruel treatment (as crimes against humanity and violations of the laws and customs of war)
- Penalty: 25 years' imprisonment
- Capture status: surrendered on 16 April 1998

Details
- Victims: Non-Serb detainees from the Prijedor region
- Span of crimes: 1992–1992
- Country: Bosnia and Herzegovina
- Locations: Omarska, Keraterm, and Trnopolje concentration camps
- Date apprehended: 16 April 1998 while serving a prison sentence in Banja Luka

Zoran Žigić (born 20 September 1958), sometimes known by the nickname Žiga, is a former reserve policeman who was found guilty by the International Criminal Tribunal for the former Yugoslavia (ICTY) of persecutions, torture and cruel treatment – constituting crimes against humanity and violations of the laws and customs of war – committed at the Omarska, Keraterm, and Trnopolje concentration camps in Prijedor, Bosnia and Herzegovina, during the Bosnian War.

Žigić was born, raised and worked as a taxi driver in and around the town of Prijedor until late May 1992, and was known to the police in the village of Omarska near Prijedor as a petty criminal. In late May 1992 he was mobilised as a reserve police officer. In this role he regularly entered the Omarska and Keraterm camps which held almost exclusively non-Serb detainees from the surrounding districts who had been rounded up during the ethnic cleansing of central Bosanska Krajina. He also entered the Trnopolje camp. When he entered the camps he abused detainees, eagerly participating in crimes of serious physical and mental violence against non-Serbs detained at the camps. His crimes included the murder of one detainee at the Omarska camp and three detainees at the Keraterm camp. The Omarska camp was closed in late August following international outcry in the wake of a visit and reporting by British journalist Ed Vulliamy. In 1994 Žigić was convicted on unrelated murder charges by a Bosnian Serb court and sentenced to 15 years' imprisonment in the prison in Banja Luka.

He was indicted by the ICTY in 1995, surrendered to ICTY investigators in April 1998 at Banja Luka prison, and was transferred to the ICTY. He entered pleas of not guilty to all eight counts under the indictment, and along with his co-accused Miroslav Kvočka, Milojica Kos, Mlađo Radić and Dragoljub Prcać was tried by the ICTY between 28 February 2000 and 2 November 2001. Žigić was sentenced to twenty-five years' imprisonment, the longest term out of the five co-accused. His conviction was upheld on appeal in February 2005, and his sentence was affirmed. A motion for reconsideration was denied, and in June 2006 he was transferred to an Austrian jail to serve the rest of his sentence. He was granted early release effective 16 December 2014, and his request to avoid extradition back to Bosnia and Herzegovina to complete his sentence for murder was denied. As of 2023 his whereabouts were unknown.

== Early life ==
Zoran Žigić was born on 20 September 1958 in the village of Balte near Prijedor in Bosnia and Herzegovina. In civilian life he was a taxi driver, and prior to the war he was known to the police at the Omarska police station as a petty criminal. Early in the Bosnian War he was mobilised as a reserve police officer.

== Omarska, Keraterm and Trnopolje concentration camps ==
In September 1991, as Yugoslavia continued to break up, several Bosnian Serb autonomous regions were proclaimed in Bosnia and Herzegovina, which then each established what was known as a crisis staff. Each crisis staff consisted of the leaders of the Bosnian Serb-dominated Serb Democratic Party (SDS), the local Yugoslav People's Army (JNA) commander, and Bosnian Serb police officials. Initially the Serb Autonomous Region of Krajina (ARK) did not include the Prijedor municipality – which incorporated the town itself and some outlying villages. Within the municipality the local government was run by the Bosnian Muslim-dominated Party of Democratic Action (SDA), which had a small majority. On 30 April 1992, the SDS, assisted by police and military forces, took over the town of Prijedor, and JNA soldiers occupied all the prominent institutions in the town. A local crisis staff was created, reporting to the ARK crisis staff in the city of Banja Luka 50 km (31 mi) to the east. Immediately after the Bosnian Serb takeover of the municipality, non-Serbs were targeted for abusive treatment. After the JNA became the Bosnian Serb Army (VRS) on 20 May, majority non-Serb villages in the Prijedor area were attacked by the VRS, and the population rounded up, although some fled. This occurred in Prijedor town itself on 30 May. Older men, and women and children were separated from men aged between 15 and 65, who were transported to the police station in Prijedor then bussed to either the Omarska or Keraterm concentration camps. The elderly men, women and children were generally taken to the Trnopolje concentration camp. All three camps were in the wider Prijedor municipality. Later in the summer, non-Serb community leaders who had not been rounded up initially were arrested, taken to the police station and beaten then sent to one of the camps.

The Omarska camp was situated at the Ljubija mine. Preparations for its operation began around 27 May, and it was officially established on 31 May by Simo Drljača, the chief of police in Prijedor and a member of the local crisis staff. Initially, the camp was intended to operate for about 15 days, but remained open until late August 1992. Every detainee was interrogated at least once, usually involving severe mental and physical abuse. According to the Bosnian Serb authorities, a total of 3,334 detainees were held at the camp for some time during its almost three month operation. Former detainees estimated that up to 3,000 people were held at any given time, and former camp workers stated that number exceeded 2,000. The bulk of the detainees were men, although 36 women were also detained in the camp, most of whom were well known in the Prijedor community before the war. Some boys as young as 15 were held in the early days of the camp's operation. The detainees were almost all Bosnian Muslims or Bosnian Croats, with a few Bosnian Serbs held due to suspicions they had been collaborating with Bosnian Muslims.

While held at the camp, detainees were kept in inhumane conditions and there was a pervasive atmosphere of extreme mental and physical violence. Intimidation, extortion, beatings, and torture were commonplace. Events that provided regular opportunities for abuse of detainees included the arrival of new detainees, interrogations, mealtimes and use of the toilet facilities. Outsiders entered the camp and were allowed to assault the detainees at random as they chose. Murder was common. Deliberate brutality and appalling conditions were integral to daily life in the camp. The majority of the detainees were held in the largest building at the mine, known as the "hangar", which had been built to house the heavy mine trucks and machinery. While the eastern part of the building was an open area, on the western side of the hangar were two floors with over 40 separate rooms. The three other buildings were the administration building which housed detainees on the ground floor, and on the first floor there were a series of rooms used for interrogations, the administration of the camp, and the female detainees' sleeping quarters. A small garage was attached. There were also two smaller buildings, the "white house" and the "red house". Between the hangar and administration building was an L-shaped 30 m (98 ft) concrete strip known as the "pista". Detainees received an inadequate quantity of poor quality food that was often rotten or inedible, and most detainees lost 25–35 kg (55–77 lb) of body weight while held at the camp, and were often beaten while moving in or out of the eating area. They were also provided with an inadequate quantity of water. Detainees were often beaten while moving to and from the inadequate toilet facilities and instead soiled themselves. The conditions in the camp and the medical care provided were grossly inadequate. Interrogations were carried out regularly and in an inhumane and cruel manner, and created an atmosphere of violence and terror. Detainees held in the administration building, in the hangar, and on the pista, were repeatedly subjected to mental and physical violence. Detainees were frequently beaten and murdered in and around the red house and white house. Female detainees were subjected to various forms of sexual violence in the camp.

The Keraterm and Trnopolje camps operated in a similar manner to the Omarska camp. Like Omarska, Keraterm only held a small number of female detainees, and most of the detainees were Bosnian Muslims, with a few Bosnian Croats. Overcrowding was severe, the conditions unhygienic, food and water inadequate. Most detainees were interrogated, detainees were beaten and sometimes killed with no apparent reason, and women were raped. Trnopolje camp held women, children and the elderly, and it was also a brutal camp, although some witnesses stated that conditions were more bearable than at Omarska and Keraterm camps. At Trnopolje, food, water and hygiene were far from adequate, and violence was ever-present.

On 7 August 1992, the British journalist Ed Vulliamy reported on the shocking conditions in the Omarska and Trnopolje camps, having visited them in the preceding days at the invitation of the president of the self-proclaimed Bosnian Serb proto-state, Republika Srpska, Radovan Karadžić. The international outcry that arose from Vulliamy's reporting and photographs of emaciated detainees caused the Bosnian Serbs to close the Omarska camp soon after, although many of the detainees were just moved to other camps.

== Activity of Žigić at the camps ==
According to findings by the International Criminal Tribunal for the former Yugoslavia (ICTY) during Žigić's trial and appeal, during the operation of Omarska camp between late May and the end of August 1992, Žigić regularly entered the Omarska camp in order to abuse detainees. He physically and directly perpetrated crimes of serious physical and mental violence against non-Serbs detained at the camp, was aware of the persecutory nature of these crimes and eagerly participated in them. He murdered the detainee Bećir Medunjanin at the Omarska camp, and directly participated in the beating of three detainees – amounting to torture, aided and abetted the beating of another, and intentionally humiliated another detainee by making him wash himself and drink from a puddle on the pista – amounting to cruel treatment.

Žigić was essentially a delivery man at the Keraterm camp, but was also permitted to enter the camp on a regular basis to beat detainees. He committed persecution, torture and murder in Keraterm camp as part of a widespread or systematic attack against non-Serbs detained at the camp, constituting crimes against humanity. These crimes included the murders of Sead Jusufagić, Emsud Bahonjić, and Drago Tokmadžić. He also beat a number of prisoners – amounting to torture and cruel treatment, and beat and wounded other detainees – constituting inhumane acts. Žigić's involvement in the crimes committed in the Omarska and Keraterm camps was intentional and substantial. Žigić also entered the Trnopolje camp and beat detainees, constituting cruel treatment. In 1994, Žigić was tried and convicted by a Bosnian Serb court in Prijedor for a murder unrelated to his activities at the three camps and was sentenced to 15 years' imprisonment.

== Indictment, surrender, trial and sentencing ==
In 1993, the ICTY was established by the United Nations (UN) to prosecute war crimes that took place in the Balkans in the 1990s. On 10 February 1995, Žigić, along with 18 other persons allegedly involved in the running of the Omarska camp, was indicted by the Prosecutor of the International Criminal Tribunal for the former Yugoslavia (ICTY), Richard Goldstone. The indictments were reviewed and confirmed by Judge Adolphus Karibi-Whyte of the court three days later. On 20 December 1995, following the signing of the Dayton Agreement, the UN Protection Force in Bosnia and Herzegovina was replaced by the North Atlantic Treaty Organisation (NATO)-led multi-national peace enforcement operation known as the Implementation Force (IFOR). Once the peace agreement had been implemented, IFOR gave way in turn to the NATO-led Stabilisation Force (SFOR) on 20 December 1996. On 16 April 1998, Žigić, who was still serving his sentence in the Banja Luka prison, surrendered to ICTY investigators and was transferred to the ICTY the same day. He made his first appearance before the court on 20 April 1998 when he entered pleas of not guilty to all charges against him. On 31 May 1999, the indictment relating to Žigić was amended to encompass only the prosecutions of Miroslav Kvočka, Milojica Kos, Mlađo Radić, and Žigić, and proceedings regarding other persons allegedly involved in the running of the camp were dealt with separately.

The amended indictment on which Žigić was tried comprised the following counts against him:

- Count 1 – Persecutions on political, racial or religious grounds, a crime against humanity
- Count 2 – Inhumane acts, a crime against humanity
- Count 3 – Outrages upon personal dignity, a violation of the laws or customs of war
- Count 6 – Murder, a crime against humanity
- Count 7 – Murder, a violation of the laws or customs of war
- Count 11 – Torture, a crime against humanity
- Count 12 – Torture, a violation of the laws or customs of war
- Count 13 – Cruel treatment, a violation of the laws or customs of war

The trial before judges Almiro Rodrigues (presiding), Fouad Riad and Patricia Wald commenced on 28 February 2000, and during the trial Slobodan Stojanović was Žigić's defence counsel. On 6 March 2000 the trial was adjourned following the arrest of Žigić's co-accused Dragoljub Prcać by SFOR in Bosnia the previous day. Prcać's prosecution was added to the case and the trial resumed on 2 May 2000. The trial was held over 113 days, and 50 witnesses gave evidence for the prosecution, and Žigić's defence counsel called 25 witnesses. There were 305 prosecution exhibits and Žigić's defence counsel produced 32 exhibits. On 6 November 2000, Žigić filed a motion for acquittal in accordance with ICTY rules, and on 28 November the motion was given a hearing. On 15 December 2000, the trial chamber acquitted him of charges that concerned ten alleged victims relating to Counts 1–3 and 11–14, and also in relation to an allegation of forced fellatio as far as it concerned the other alleged victims listed against Counts 6–7 and 11–14. Closing arguments were presented from 16 to 19 July 2001, and judgement was delivered on 2 November 2001. In relation to his activities at the Omarska camp, Žigić was found guilty on Counts 1 (persecutions), 7 (murder), 11 (torture), 12 (torture), and 13 (cruel treatment), and the remaining counts were dismissed. In relation to his activities at the Keraterm and Trnopolje camps, Žigić was found guilty on Counts 1 (persecution), 7 (murder), 12 (torture), and 13 (cruel treatment), and the remaining counts were dismissed, and he was sentenced to twenty-five years' imprisonment. Žigić was given credit for time served since 16 April 1998. His four co-accused were also found guilty, but Žigić received the longest sentence of imprisonment.

== Appeal and motion for reconsideration ==
On 16 November 2001, Žigić filed a notice of general appeal of both his conviction and the sentence received. he advanced 47 separate grounds of appeal, including the doctrine of joint criminal enterprise (JCE) and the manner in which it was pleaded. He was again represented by Stojanović. The appeals chamber of the ICTY rendered its judgement on 28 February 2005, and overturned Žigić's convictions for crimes committed as a participant in the JCE. This meant that his convictions against Counts 1 (persecution), 7 (murder), and 12 (torture) as they related to his responsibility for crimes committed at the Omarska camp generally were reversed. However, the appeals chamber affirmed his conviction against Count 1 (persecution) for crimes committed against sixteen individual detainees, against Count 7 (murder) for crimes committed against four individual detainees, and Count 12 (torture) for crimes committed against nine individual detainees. It dismissed the remaining grounds of appeal, dismissed his appeal against his sentence and affirmed it. On 7 December 2005, Žigić filed a motion for reconsideration for the appeals chamber to reconsider its appeal judgement and either order a retrial or acquit him of all convictions except for the conviction for persecution against Sead Jusufagić at Keraterm camp in June 1992 and the conviction for cruel treatment against another victim committed at Omarska camp in June 1992, for both of which he admitted criminal responsibility. In the motion, Žigić merely repeated the arguments he made to the appeals chamber in his appeal, alleging errors of fact by the trial chamber. On 19 May 2006, Žigić petitioned the President of the ICTY, Judge Fausto Pocar, about the country in which he was to serve his sentence. As he had no right to petition Pocar on this issue, his petition was dismissed on 31 May. On 8 June 2006, Žigić was transferred to Austria to serve his sentence, at Graz-Karlau Prison. On 26 June 2006, the appeals chamber concluded that Žigić's motion for reconsideration was frivolous and constituted an abuse of process, and it was denied.

== Applications for conditional release and eventual release ==
On 17 August 2010, Austrian authorities advised the ICTY that Žigić was eligible for conditional release under Austrian law. On 22 September 2010, the Austrian judicial authorities approved Žigić's extradition to Bosnia and Herzegovina to serve the balance of his 1994 sentence for murder. On 8 November 2010, Judge Patrick Robinson, as President of the ICTY, denied Žigić conditional release, after considering the treatment of similarly situated prisoners, the gravity of his crimes, very limited evidence of rehabilitation, cooperation with the prosecution, and the amount of time he had spent in detention.

On 10 November 2014 Žigić was granted early release effective 16 December 2014, on the order of Judge Theodor Meron, the president of the International Residual Mechanism for Criminal Tribunals (IRMCT) – which was performing the remaining functions of the ICTY following the completion of its mandate – after Žigić had served two-thirds of his sentence. In October 2014 it had been reported that he petitioned the president of the IRMCT to not give consent to the Austrian authorities to extradite him to Bosnia and Herzegovina to serve the remainder of his 1994 sentence for murder. On 12 December 2014, Meron denied Žigić's request that the IRMCT not give consent to his extradition. A 2023 study of the lives of war criminals from the 1990s Balkan conflicts who had been released having served their sentences was unable to find any information regarding Žigić's whereabouts, but it was assumed that he had not been in the public eye, as his presence would have been reported in the media.

The development of standards for early release by the IRMCT were examined by Gabriela Markolovic in the Cornell Law Review in 2022. She concluded that the law of early release by the IRMCT and other international courts and tribunals has developed in three phases, to the point where a presumption for early release at the two-third point of a sentence, which Žigić was granted by Meron, has now been rejected and replaced with a presumption against early release along with the introduction of release with conditions similar to parole.
