= Omarska concentration camp =

1992 Bosnian Serb concentration camp

Omarska
- Concentration Camp
- Location of Omarska in Bosnia and Herzegovina
- Interactive map of Omarska
- Coordinates: 44°52′09″N 16°52′58″E
- Location: Omarska, Prijedor, Bosnia and Herzegovina
- Operated by: Bosnian Serb forces
- Operational: 25 May – 21 August 1992 (2 months, 3 weeks and 6 days)
- Inmates: Bosniaks and Bosnian Croats
- Number of inmates: c. 6,000
- Killed: 700

The Omarska camp was a concentration camp run by the Army of Republika Srpska in the mining town of Omarska, near Prijedor in northern Bosnia and Herzegovina, set up for Bosniak (Bosnian Muslim) and Bosnian Croat prisoners during the Prijedor ethnic cleansing. Functioning in the first months of the Bosnian War in 1992, it was one of 677 alleged detention centers and camps set up throughout Bosnia and Herzegovina during the war. While nominally an "investigation center" or "assembly point" for members of the Bosniak and Croatian population, Human Rights Watch classified Omarska as a concentration camp.

The International Criminal Tribunal for the Former Yugoslavia, located in The Hague, found several individuals guilty of crimes against humanity perpetrated at Omarska. Murder, torture, rape, and abuse of prisoners was common. Around 6,000 Bosniaks and Bosnian Croats, mainly men, were held at the camp for about five months in the spring and summer of 1992. Hundreds died of starvation, punishment, beatings, ill-treatment and executions.

== Overview ==
Omarska is a predominantly Serbian village in northwestern Bosnia, near the town of Prijedor. The camp in the village existed from about 25 May to about 21 August 1992, when the Army of Republika Srpska and police unlawfully segregated, detained and confined some of more than 7,000 Bosniaks and Bosnian Croats captured in Prijedor. Serb authorities termed it an "investigation center" and the detainees were accused of paramilitary activities. By the end of 1992, the war had resulted in the death or forced departure of most of the Bosniak and Croat population of Prijedor municipality. About 7,000 people went missing from a population of 25,000, and there are 14 mass graves and hundreds of individual graves in the extended region. There is conflicting information about how many people were killed at Omarska. According to survivors, usually about 30 and sometimes as many as 150 men were singled out and killed in the camp per day. The U.S. State Department and other governments believe that, at a minimum, hundreds of detainees, some of whose identities are unknown, did not survive; many others were killed during the evacuation of the camps in the Prijedor area.

== Prijedor ethnic cleansing ==
A declaration on the takeover of Prijedor by Serb forces was prepared by Serbian Democratic Party (SDS) politicians and was repeatedly read out on Radio Prijedor the day after the takeover. Four-hundred Bosnian Serb policemen were assigned to participate in the takeover, the objective of which was to seize the functions of the president of the municipality, the vice-president of the municipality, the director of the post office, the chief of the police, etc. On the night of the 29/30 April 1992, the takeover of power took place. Serb employees of the public security station and reserve police gathered in Cirkin Polje, part of the town of Prijedor. The people there were given the task of taking over power in the municipality and were broadly divided into five groups. Each group of about twenty had a leader and each was ordered to gain control of certain buildings. One group was responsible for the Assembly building, one for the main police building, one for the courts, one for the bank and the last for the post-office. The International Criminal Tribunal for the Former Yugoslavia (ICTY) concluded that the takeover by the Serb politicians was an illegal coup d'état, which was planned and coordinated long in advance with the ultimate aim of creating a pure Serbian municipality. These plans were never hidden and they were implemented in a coordinated action by the Serb police, army and politicians. One of the leading figures was Milomir Stakić, who came to play the dominant role in the political life of the municipality.

== Camp ==
Emaciated detainees at the Omarska concentration camp

In May 1992, intensive shelling and infantry attacks on Bosniak areas in the municipality caused the Bosniak survivors to flee their homes. The majority of them surrendered or were captured by Serb forces. As the Army of Republika Srpska rounded up Bosniak and Croat men, they forced them to march in columns bound for one or another of the prison camps that the Serb authorities had established in the municipality. On about 25 May 1992, about three weeks after the Serbs took control of the municipal government, and two days after the start of large scale military attacks on Bosniak population centers, Serb forces began taking prisoners to the Omarska camp. During the next several weeks, the Serbs continued to round up Bosniaks and Croats from Kozarac near Prijedor, and other places in the municipality and send them to the camps. Many Bosniak and Bosnian Croat intellectuals and politicians were sent to Omarska. While virtually all of the prisoners were male, there were also 37 women detained in the camp, who served food and cleaned the walls of the torture rooms, and were repeatedly raped in the canteen; bodies of five of them have been exhumed.

The Omarska mines complex was located about 20 kilometres (12 mi) from Prijedor. The first detainees were taken to the camp at some point between 26 and 30 May. The camp buildings were almost completely full and some of the detainees had to be held in the area between the two main buildings. That area was lit up by specially installed spot-lights after the detainees arrived. Female detainees were held separately in the administrative building. According to the wartime documents of Serb authorities, there were a total of 3,334 persons held in the camp from 27 May to 16 August 1992; 3,197 were Bosniaks and 125 were Croats.

Within the area of the Omarska mining complex that was used for the camp, the camp authorities generally confined the prisoners in three different buildings: the administration building, where interrogations and killings took place; the crammed hangar building; the "white house", where the inmates were tortured; and on a cement courtyard area between the buildings known as the "pista", an L-shaped strip of concrete land in between, also a scene of torture and mass killings. There was another small building, known as the "red house", where prisoners were sometimes taken in order to be summarily executed. With the arrival of the first detainees, permanent guard posts and anti-personnel landmines were set up around the camp. The conditions in the camp were horrible. In the building known as the "white house", the rooms were crowded with 45 people in a room no larger than 20 square metres (220 sq ft). The faces of the detainees were distorted and bloodstained and the walls were covered with blood. From the beginning, the detainees were beaten with fists, rifle butts and wooden and metal sticks. The guards mostly hit the heart and kidneys whenever they decided to beat someone to death. In the "garage", between 150 and 160 people were "packed like sardines" and the heat was unbearable. For the first few days, the detainees were not allowed out and were given only a jerry can of water and some bread. Men would suffocate during the night and their bodies would be taken out the following morning. The room behind the restaurant was known as "Mujo’s Room". The dimensions of this room were about 12 m × 15 m (39 ft × 49 ft) and the average number of people detained there was 500, most of whom were Bosniaks. The women in the camp slept in the interrogations rooms, which they would have to clean each day as the rooms were covered in blood and pieces of skin and hair. In the camp one could hear the moaning and wailing of people who were being beaten.

The detainees at Omarska had one meal a day. The food was usually spoiled and the process of getting the food, eating and returning the plate usually lasted around three minutes. Meals were often accompanied by beatings. The toilets were blocked and there was human waste everywhere. British journalist Ed Vulliamy testified that when he visited the camp, the detainees were in very poor physical condition. He witnessed them eating a bowl of soup and some bread and said that he had the impression they had not eaten in a long time; they appeared terrified. According to Vulliamy, the detainees drank water from a river that was polluted with industrial waste and many suffered from constipation or dysentery. No criminal report was ever filed against persons detained in the Omarska camp, nor were the detainees apprised of any concrete charges against them. Apparently, there was no legitimate reason justifying these people’s detention.

Murder, torture, rape, and abuse of prisoners was common. Detainees were kept in inhumane conditions and an atmosphere of extreme psychological and physical violence pervaded the camp. The camp guards and frequent visitors who came to the camps used all types of weapons and instruments to beat and otherwise physically abuse the detainees. In particular, Bosniak and Bosnian Croat political and civic leaders, intellectuals, the wealthy, and other non-Serbs who were considered "extremists" or to have resisted the Bosnian Serbs were especially subjected to beatings and mistreatment which often resulted in death.

In addition, the Omarska and Keraterm camps also operated in a manner designed to discriminate and subjugate the non-Serbs by inhumane acts and cruel treatment. These acts included the brutal living conditions imposed on the prisoners. There was a deliberate policy of overcrowding and lack of basic necessities of life, including inadequate food, polluted water, insufficient or non-existent medical care and unhygienic and cramped conditions. The prisoners all suffered serious psychological and physical deterioration and were in a state of constant fear. Inmates were usually killed by shooting, beating or by the cutting of throats; however, in one incident, prisoners were incinerated on a pyre of burning tires. The corpses were then transferred onto trucks by other inmates or using bulldozers. There were instances where prisoners were brought to dig the graves and did not return. The ICTY Trial Chamber in the Stakić case found on the basis of the evidence presented at trial, that "over 100" prisoners were killed at the camp in late July 1992. About 200 people from Hambarine brought to the camp in July 1992 were held in the building known as the "white House". In the early hours of 17 July, gunshots were heard that continued until dawn. Corpses were seen in front of the "white house" and camp guards were seen shooting rounds of ammunition into the bodies. A witness testified that "everyone was given an extra bullet that was shot in their heads". About 180 bodies in total were loaded onto a truck and taken away.

The camp was closed immediately after a visit by foreign journalists in early August. On 6 or 7 August 1992, the detainees at Omarska were divided into groups and transported in buses to different destinations. About 1,500 people were transported on twenty buses.

=== Death toll ===
As part of the ethnic cleansing operations, the Omarska, Keraterm, Manjača, and Trnopolje camps helped the Crisis Committee of the Serbian District of Prijedor to reduce the non-Serb population of Prijedor from more than 50,000 in 1992 to little more than 3,000 in 1995, and even fewer subsequently. Precise calculations about the number who actually died in these camps are difficult to make. Newsweek reporter Roy Gutman claimed that US State Department officials, along with representatives of other Western governments, told him that 4,000–5,000 people, the vast majority of them non-Serbs, perished at Omarska. Journalist Bill Berkeley puts the death toll at 2,000. A member of the United Nations (UN) Commission of Experts testified during the trial of Duško Tadić at the ICTY that their number was in the thousands, but she could not be precise, despite the fact that Serbian officials confirmed there were no large scale releases of prisoners sent there. A member of the Crisis Committee, Simo Drljača, who served as chief of police for Prijedor, has stated that there were 6,000 "informative conversations" (meaning interrogations) in Omarska, Keraterm and Trnopolje, and that 1,503 non-Serbs were transferred from those three camps to Manjača, leaving 4,497 unaccounted for according to Human Rights Watch. According to the Association of Camp Detainess of Prijedor 1992, between May and August 1992, around 6,000 prisoners passed through Omarska, 700 of whom were killed.

== International reaction ==
In early August 1992, Vulliamy, Independent Television News (ITN) reporter Penny Marshall, and Channel 4 News reporter Ian Williams gained access to the Omarska camp. Their reporting served as one of the catalysts of a UN effort to investigate war crimes committed in the conflict. The camp was closed less than a month after its exposure caused international uproar.

=== 1997–2000 controversy ===
Between 1997 and 2000, there was academic and media controversy regarding the events that took place in Omarska and Trnopolje in 1992, due to claims of false reporting and "lies". These allegations, promoted by the state-controlled Radio Television of Serbia (RTS) and the British Living Marxism (LM) paper, prompted the ITN network to accuse the LM of libel; ITN won the case in 2000, effectively forcing the paper to close down.

== Trials ==
"We were able to establish that the Omarska camp was one of the most brutal and cruel camps that had been established during the wars in the former Yugoslavia."

— Bob Reid, Deputy Chief of Investigations, ICTY Office of the Prosecutor

The Republika Srpska officials responsible for running the camp have since been indicted and found guilty of crimes against humanity and war crimes.

- Commanders of the camp, Miroslav Kvočka, Dragoljub Prcać, Milojica Kos, and Mlađo Radić, and a local taxi driver, Zoran Žigić were all found guilty of crimes against humanity. Kvočka, Prcač, Kos and Radić were sentenced to five, six, seven and 20 years respectively; Žigić was given the longest term of 25 years.
- Željko Mejakić was found guilty of crimes against humanity (murder, imprisonment, torture, sexual violence, persecution, and other inhumane acts). He was the de facto commander of Omarska and perpetrated one instance of mistreatment. It was found that he was part of a joint criminal enterprise with the intent of promoting mistreatment and persecution of detainees in the camp. He was sentenced to 21 years of imprisonment.
- Momčilo Gruban was found guilty of crimes against humanity (murder, imprisonment, torture, sexual violence, persecution, and other inhumane acts). He had command responsibility for crimes committed at the camp and acted as part of a joint criminal enterprise. He was sentenced to 11 years imprisonment.
- Dušan Knežević was found guilty of crimes against humanity (murder, torture, sexual violence, persecution, and other inhumane acts). He was found to have been directly involved in the crimes carried out in the Omarska and Keraterm camps. He was also found guilty under the theory of joint criminal enterprise for furthering the Omarska and Keraterm camps’ systems of mistreatment and persecution of detainees. He was sentenced to 31 years imprisonment.

On 26 February 2007, the International Court of Justice (ICJ) presented its judgment in the Bosnian Genocide Case, in which it had examined atrocities committed in detention camps, including Omarska, in relation to Article II (b) of the Genocide Convention. The Court stated in its judgment:

Having carefully examined the evidence presented before it, and taken note of that presented to the ICTY, the Court considers that it has been established by fully conclusive evidence that members of the protected group were systematically victims of massive mistreatment, beatings, rape and torture causing serious bodily and mental harm during the conflict and, in particular, in the detention camps. The requirements of the material element, as defined by Article II (b) of the Convention are thus fulfilled. The Court finds, however, on the basis of evidence before it, that it has not been conclusively established that those atrocities, although they too may amount to war crimes and crimes against humanity, were committed with the specific intent (dolus specialis) to destroy the protected group, in whole or in part, required for a finding that genocide has been perpetrated.

== Exhumations ==
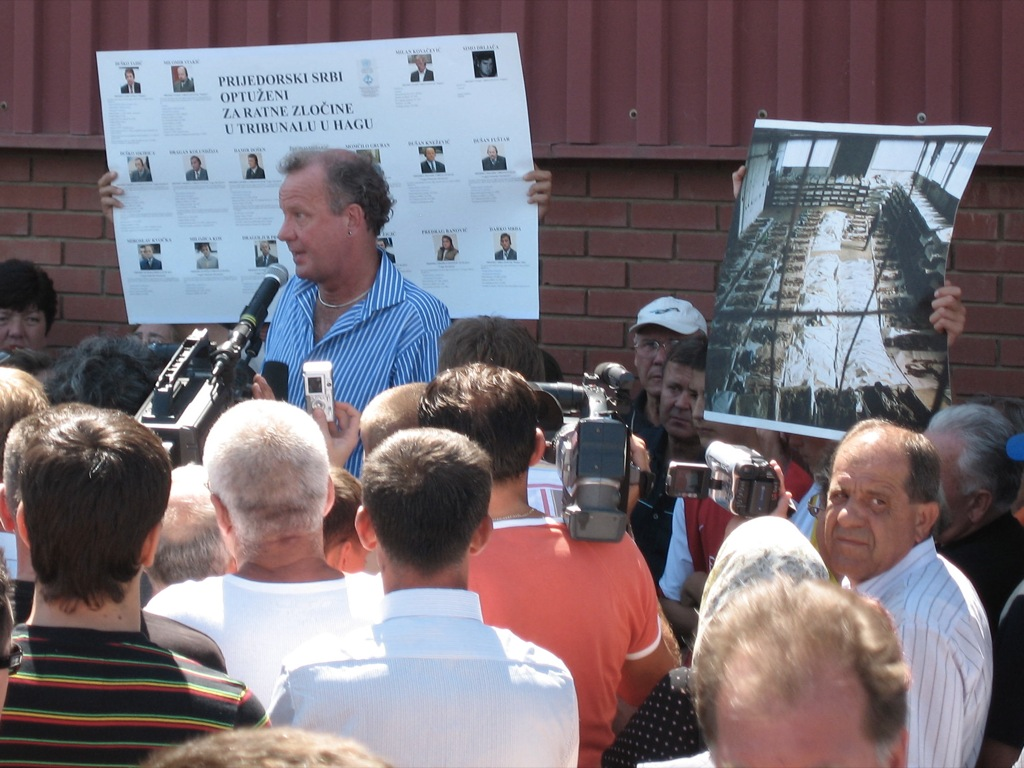
Ed Vulliamy speaking at the 2006 Omarska camp commemoration

In 2004, a mass grave located a few hundred meters from the Omarska site was unearthed containing the remains of 456 persons from the camp. "There is no doubt whatsoever that there are hundreds of bodies as yet unfound within the mine of Omarska and its vicinity" said Amor Mašović, president of the Bosnian government's Commission for Tracing Missing Persons. The International Commission on Missing Persons (ICMP) has been active in advocating the exhumation and identification of their bodies from mass graves around the area; with their help, a number of victims have been identified through DNA testing.

== Memorial controversy ==
Mittal Steel Company purchased the Omarska mining complex and planned to resume extraction of iron ore from the site. Mittal Steel announced in Banja Luka on 1 December 2005 that the company would build and finance a memorial in the "White House" but the project was later abandoned. Many Bosnian Serbs believe there should not be a memorial, while many Bosniaks believe that construction should be postponed until all the victims are found and only if the entire mine—which is in use—be allocated for the memorial site.

By the time of the 20th anniversary of the camp's closure proposals for a physical memorial to the camp's existence had made no progress. ArcelorMittal said that it was prepared to meet the former inmates' demands but the local authorities were ultimately responsible for granting permission. The Republika Srpska authorities considered that allowing camp survivors free access to the site and the construction of a memorial as originally agreed by ArcelorMittal would undermine reconciliation. "Prijedor 92" president Mirsad Duratović, stated that the campaign for a memorial would continue.

In July 2012, ahead of the start of the 2012 London Olympic Games, survivors of the camp laid claim to the ArcelorMittal Orbit tower, the tallest structure in Britain, located in the Olympic Park beside the Olympic stadium, as the 'Omarska Memorial in Exile'. The survivors allege that the Orbit is "tragically intertwined with the history of war crimes in Bosnia, as the bones of victims are mixed in with the iron ore". ArcelorMittal denied that material from Omarska had been used in the Orbit's construction. The company said that sensitive issues relating to the mine could not be addressed by ArcelorMittal on its own. Campaigners urged ArcelorMittal as the world's largest steel producer to use its considerable influence to oppose the local politics of denial and play an active role in healing fractured communities that have made the company's success possible. Susan Schuppli of the Centre for Research Architecture at Goldsmiths' College in London, observed that ArcelorMittal insistence on "not taking sides" in an area where persecution and injustice continued was not neutrality but taking a political position by default.

== See also ==
- Dretelj camp
- Gabela camp
- Heliodrom camp
- Uzamnica camp
- Vilina Vlas
- Vojno camp
