= Žigić =

Žigić (Serbian Cyrillic: Жигић, pronounced [ʒǐːɡitɕ]) is a surname. Notable people with the surname include:

- Nikola Žigić, Serbian footballer
- Sandra Žigić, Croatian footballer
- Zoran Žigić, Bosnian Serb military leader
