= Busnovi =

Busnovi may refer to:

- Busnovi, Croatia, village near Brestovac
- Busnovi, Bosnia and Herzegovina, village near Prijedor
