= Trnopolje camp =

Prison camp during the Bosnian War

Trnopolje
- Concentration camp
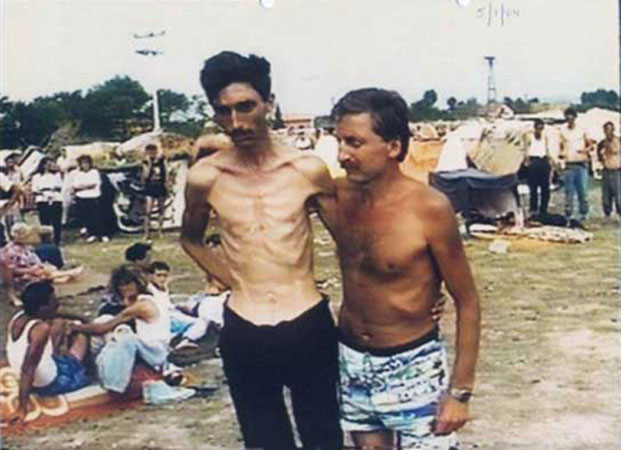
- Detainees at the Trnopolje Camp, near Prijedor, Bosnia and Herzegovina. (Note: Photograph provided courtesy of the International Criminal Tribunal for the former Yugoslavia.)

- Location within Bosnia and Herzegovina
- Coordinates: 44°56′02.2″N 16°48′14.8″E
- Location: Near Prijedor, Bosnia and Herzegovina
- Operated by: Bosnian Serb military and police authorities
- Original use: Primary school
- Operational: May – November 1992
- Inmates: Bosniaks and Bosnian Croats
- Number of inmates: c. 30,000
- Killed: 90

The Trnopolje camp was an internment camp established by Republika Srpska military and police authorities in the village of Trnopolje near Prijedor in northern Bosnia and Herzegovina, during the first months of the Bosnian War. Also variously termed a concentration camp, detainment camp, detention camp, prison, and ghetto, Trnopolje held between 4,000 and 7,000 Bosniak and Bosnian Croat inmates at any one time and served as a staging area for mass deportations, mainly of women, children, and elderly men. Between May and November 1992, an estimated 30,000 inmates passed through. Mistreatment was widespread and there were numerous instances of torture, rape, and killing; ninety inmates died.

In August 1992, the existence of the Prijedor camps was discovered by the Western media, leading to their closure. Trnopolje was transferred into the hands of the International Red Cross (IRC) in mid-August, and closed in November 1992. After the war, the International Criminal Tribunal for the former Yugoslavia (ICTY) convicted several Bosnian Serb officials of war crimes and crimes against humanity for their roles in the camp, but ruled that the abuses perpetrated in Prijedor did not constitute genocide. Crimes in Trnopolje were also listed in the ICTY's indictment of former Serbian President Slobodan Milošević, who died mid-trial in March 2006.

== Background ==
The administrative district (Serbo-Croatian: opština or općina) of Prijedor is made up of 71 smaller towns and villages. According to the 1991 Yugoslav census, Prijedor had a total population of 112,470, of which 44 percent identified as Bosnian Muslims (Bosniaks), 42.5 percent as Serbs, 5.6 percent as Croats, 5.7 percent as Yugoslavs and 2.2 percent as "others" (Ukrainians, Russians, and Italians). Prijedor was of strategic significance to the Bosnian Serbs as it connected north-western Bosnia with the Republic of Serbian Krajina (RSK) in Croatia, a breakaway state that had been established by Croatian Serbs in 1991. It was also in 1991 that the Serbs of Prijedor organized and enforced a Serb-only administration in the town and placed it under the control of the Bosnian Serb capital Banja Luka. Milomir Stakić, a physician who had been the deputy to the elected Bosniak mayor Muhamed Čehajić, was declared the Serb mayor of Prijedor.

On 30 April 1992, Bosnian Serb forces seized control of Prijedor. Four-hundred Bosnian Serb police participated in the takeover, whose objective was to usurp the functions of the municipality's president and vice-president, the director of the post office, and the chief of police. Serb employees of the public security station and reserve police gathered in the suburb of Čirkin Polje, where they were broadly divided into five groups of about 20 members each, and ordered to gain control of five buildings, one assigned to each group: the assembly building, police headquarters, courts, bank, and post office. Serbian Democratic Party (SDS) politicians prepared a declaration of the takeover, which was broadcast repeatedly on Radio Prijedor the following day. The International Criminal Tribunal for the Former Yugoslavia (ICTY) would conclude that the takeover was an illegal coup d'état, planned and coordinated long in advance with the aim of creating an ethnically pure municipality. The conspirators made no secret of the takeover plan, and it was implemented by the coordinated actions of Serb politicians, police, and army. Milomir Stakić, a leading figure in the coup, was to play a dominant role in the political life of the municipality during the war.

Following the seizure of power, Bosniaks and Bosnian Croats were removed from positions of responsibility. On 30 May 1992, Prijedor police chief Simo Drljača officially opened four camps (Trnopolje, Omarska, Keraterm and Manjača) where non-Serbs who failed to leave Prijedor were then confined. To avert resistance, Bosnian Serb forces interrogated all non-Serbs that were deemed a threat and arrested every Bosniak and Croat who had authority or power. Non-Serb men of fighting age were particularly targeted for interrogation and separated from women, children and the elderly.

== Operation ==
Trnopolje was a predominantly Muslim village within the Prijedor municipality prior to the outbreak of the Bosnian War. The camp formed inside it was established on the grounds of a local primary school, which was named after the concept of Brotherhood and Unity (Osnovna škola Bratstvo–Jedinstvo). Trnopolje held both male and female prisoners. Most of the non-Serb women of Prijedor passed through it at some point, and many were raped. A total of 30,000 people were detained in the camp from May to November 1992. It held 4,000–7,000 prisoners at any given time.

Trnopolje was described variously as a ghetto, a prison and a detention camp. A United Nations (UN) report from 1994 reported that Trnopolje was a concentration camp which functioned as a staging area for mass deportations mainly of women, children, and elderly men. The reported found that:

Killings were not rare in the camp, nor was the infliction of torture. Harassment in general is claimed to have been the rule and not the exception. Rapes were reportedly the most common of the serious crimes to which camp inmates were subjected. The nights were when most of the injustice was performed. The nightly terror of possibly being called out for rape or other abuses was reportedly a severe mental constraint even for short-term detainees in the camp. Many detainees reportedly never returned after venturing with or without explicit permission outside of the camp. Other former detainees report that there were times when they were ordered to bury non-Serbs, who had been killed, in fields and meadows near the camp.

Refugees reported that Trnopolje was a "decent" camp in comparison to Omarska and Keraterm as there were no systematic killings, only arbitrary ones. Indeed, many non-Serbs entered the camp voluntarily, "simply to avoid the rampaging militias plundering their streets and villages". This phenomenon led British journalist Ed Vulliamy to describe Trnopolje as "a perverse haven" for the Bosniaks and Croats of Prijedor. Author Hariz Halilovich writes:

Trnopolje had generally a better reputation and was "less bad" than Omarska as fewer people died at Trnopolje and the torture, rape and physical abuse was less systematic. In many cases, it was the last destination for detainees before they were exchanged or deported [...] from Republika Srpska territory. For many who had survived Keraterm and Omarska ... Trnopolje was "almost a summer camp".

Many inmates were starved and physically or verbally abused during their imprisonment. By August 1992, Trnopolje held about 3,500 people. On 7 August 1992, reporters from Independent Television News (ITN), a British television station, took footage of the prisoners at Omarska and Trnopolje, and recorded their living conditions. The images were shown around the world and caused public outrage. This prompted the Bosnian Serb authorities to allow journalists and the International Red Cross (IRC) access to some of the Prijedor camps, but not before the most emaciated of the prisoners were killed or shipped off to camps far from the public eye. Some 200 former male inmates were separated and killed in the Korićani Cliffs massacre on 21 August 1992. The publicity generated by the discovery of the Prijedor camps led to their closure by the end of August. In mid-August, Trnopolje was placed into the hands of the IRC. The camp was officially shut down that November.

== Aftermath ==
The camp's main building resumed its function as a local primary school following the Bosnian War. A monument to the Bosnian Serb soldiers killed in the war has also been erected in the school's vicinity. In 1997, the British magazine Living Marxism (LM) claimed that footage filmed at Trnopolje deliberately misrepresented the situation in the camp. This caused ITN to sue LM for libel in 2000. Following ITN's victory in a court case in which the evidence given by the camp doctor led LM to abandon its defence, the magazine declared itself bankrupt, avoiding payment of the large damages awarded.

"Prijedor 92", an association representing the survivors of Prijedor area camps, estimates that 90 inmates perished in the camp during its operation. During Milomir Stakić's trial, ICTY prosecutors claimed that several hundred non-Serbs were killed at Trnopolje between May and November 1992. The ICTY puts the number of inmates killed in all Bosnian Serb-run camps in Prijedor at 1,500. The number of women raped in Trnopolje remains unknown.

=== Indictments and trials ===
Milomir Stakić was convicted for his role in setting up the camps at Trnopolje, Keraterm and Omarska in July 2003 and sentenced to life imprisonment. He was acquitted of the charge of genocide. In March 2006, Stakić's sentence was reduced to 40 years on appeal. The court upheld his conviction for extermination and persecution of Prijedor's non-Serb population, but also upheld his acquittal for the charge of genocide. Zoran Žigić, a taxi-driver from Prijedor, was sentenced to 25 years' imprisonment in November 2001 for abusing, beating, torturing, raping and killing detainees at Trnopolje, as well as at Keraterm and Omarska. His conviction was upheld in February 2005, and his 25-year sentence was affirmed. Crimes committed in Trnopolje, Keraterm and Omarska were listed in the ICTY's indictment of Serbian President Slobodan Milošević following the war. Milošević died in his cell on 11 March 2006, before his trial could be completed. The International Court of Justice (ICJ) presented its judgment in the Bosnian Genocide Case on 26 February 2007, in which it examined atrocities committed in detention camps, including Trnopolje, in relation to Article II (b) of the Genocide Convention. The Court stated in its judgment:

Having carefully examined the evidence presented before it, and taken note of that presented to the ICTY, the Court considers that it has been established by fully conclusive evidence that members of the protected group were systematically victims of massive mistreatment, beatings, rape and torture causing serious bodily and mental harm during the conflict and, in particular, in the detention camps. The requirements of the material element, as defined by Article II (b) of the Convention are thus fulfilled. The Court finds, however, on the basis of evidence before it, that it has not been conclusively established that those atrocities, although they too may amount to war crimes and crimes against humanity, were committed with the specific intent (dolus specialis) to destroy the protected group, in whole or in part, required for a finding that genocide has been perpetrated.
