= Omarska =

Omarska Омарска
- Town
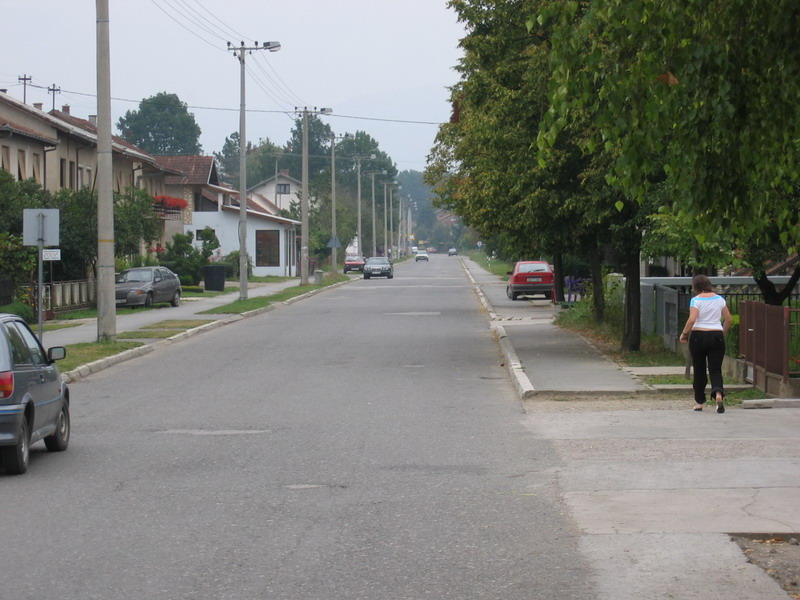
- Main street

- Location within Bosnia and Herzegovina
- Coordinates: 44°53′30″N 16°53′57″E
- Country: Bosnia and Herzegovina
- Entity: Republika Srpska
- Municipality: Prijedor
- Time zone: UTC+1 (CET)
  - Summer (DST): UTC+2 (CEST)

Omarska (Serbian Cyrillic: Омарска) is a small town near Prijedor in northwestern Bosnia and Herzegovina. The town includes an old iron mine and ore processing plant. During the Bosnian War it was the site of the Omarska concentration camp.

== History ==
=== Early and modern history ===
Archaeological finds from the wider Omarska region include remains from the Neolithic, Copper Age, Bronze Age and Iron Age.

The first municipality of Omarska was formed in 1929. It included Omarska and the surrounding villages of Niševići, Gradina, Jelićka, Marićka, Krivaja, Petrov Gaj, Kevljani, Lamovita, Bistrica and Busnovi.

=== World War II ===
During World War II, a massacre of Bosnian Serb civilians occurred in Omarska by the Ustaše.

After the Second World War, Omarska again functioned as a local administrative centre for a short period. In the early 1960s the area was incorporated into the municipality of Prijedor.

=== Bosnian War ===
The Omarska camp was a concentration camp run by Bosnian Serb forces in Omarska, set up for Bosniak and Croat men and women during the Prijedor massacre. Functioning in the first months of the Bosnian War in 1992, it was one of 677 alleged detention centers and camps set up throughout Bosnia and Herzegovina during the war. While nominally an "investigation center" or "assembly point" for members of the non-Serb population, Human Rights Watch classified Omarska as a concentration camp.

== Geography ==
=== Main Features ===
Omarska covers an area of 246.73 km², of which 155.05 km² is arable land, 88.44 km² is forest, and 3.24 km² is barren land. It extends on the southern slopes of the Kozara mountain, the eastern part of the Prijedor-Omarsko field and the northern slopes of the Bereganica mountain and includes 12 settlements: Petrov Gaj, Kevljani, Lamovita, Babići, Omarska, Bistrica, Niševići, Gradina, Jelicka, Krivaja, Marićka and Busnovi. The terrain of Omarska is mainly plains, 65% lowlands and 35% highlands. The average temperature (over the year) is +12 degrees celsius. The average yearly rain level is 1200mm.

=== Hydrography ===
The river system in Omarska is extensive. Through the middle of Omarska territory runs the river Gomjenica, which has great agricultural significance locally, because it runs through the most fertile land in this area. Gomjenica is a confluent of Sana. The river joins Sana in Prijedor.

== Demographics ==
According to the 1971 Yugoslav census, the population of Omarska was 19,044 - of which 16,084 were Serbs, 2,198 were Muslims, 376 were Croats and 433 were others. According to the 2013 census, Omarska had a population of 3,081 inhabitants.

=== Education ===
There is one elementary school in Omarska, OŠ "Vuk Karadžić", which has about 800 pupils.

=== Sports ===
Omarska has a football club, FK Omarska, which competes in the 2nd League-West of the Republika Srpska. Željko Buvač was born here, ex footballer, now assistant manager of Liverpool FC.

== Gallery ==
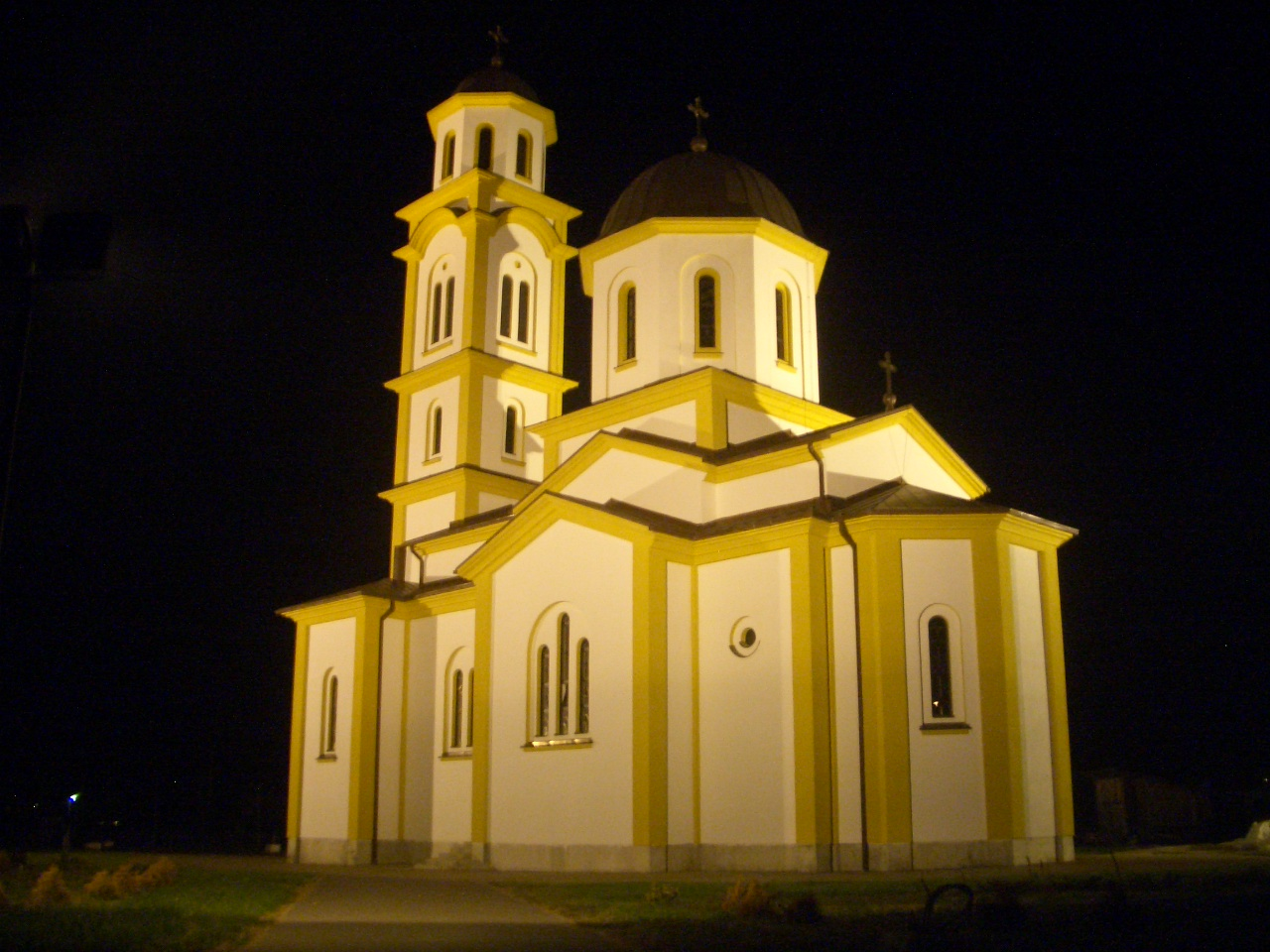
Church of St. Tsar Lazar

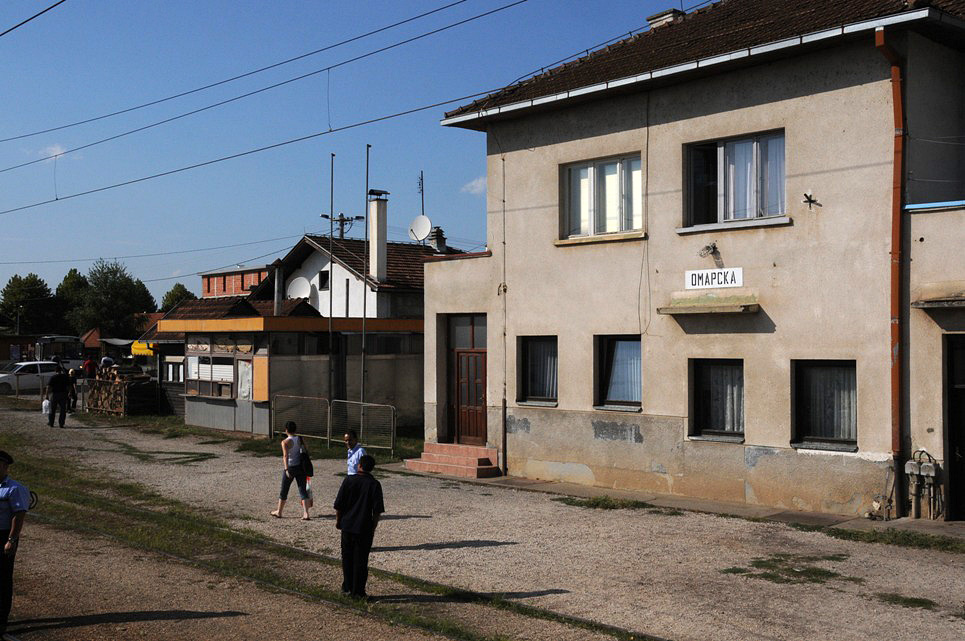
Railway Station
