= Time served =

Concept in criminal law

In typical criminal law, time served is an informal term that describes the duration of pretrial detention (remand), the time period between when a defendant is arrested and when they are convicted. Time served does not include time served on bail but only during incarceration and can range from days to, in rare cases, years. A sentence of time served means that the defendant has been sentenced to confinement, albeit retroactively fulfilled by the pretrial detention; therefore, the defendant goes free.

A sentence of time served may result from plea bargains in which in exchange for only receiving a sentence that involves no additional period of incarceration, a defendant accepts a guilty plea. Additional terms of sentence that may accompany a sentence of served also include a probation, a fine, or unpaid community service.

Statistics released in 2020 by the Victorian Sentencing Advisory Council show that 67% of people sentenced to prison in Victoria, Australia in 2017–18 spent at least one day in remand, up from 47% in 2011–12. In the same year, of the cases that Victorian courts issued imprisonment orders to, 66% exceeded time served (meaning additional time needed to be served), 29% matched time served (meaning no additional imprisonment), and 5% were less than time served (meaning the defendant was over-detained during remand). The council called the over-detention a "matter of concern", as the defendant spent longer in detention than the ultimate duration of the sentence. The council also highlighted that lower courts, such as magistrates' court, tended to give more time served sentences than higher courts.
