= Ed Vulliamy =

British-born, Irish-Welsh journalist and writer (born 1954)

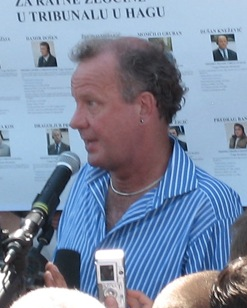
- Vulliamy in 2006
- Born: 1 August 1954 (age 72)
- Occupations: Journalist, correspondent
- Known for: War reporting in Bosnia and Iraq

Edward Sebastian Vulliamy (born 1 August 1954) is a British-born, Irish-Welsh journalist and writer.

== Early life and education ==
Vulliamy was born and raised in Notting Hill, London. His mother was the children's author and illustrator Shirley Hughes, his father was the architect John Sebastian Vulliamy, of the Vulliamy family, and his grandfathers were the Liverpool store owner Thomas Hughes and the author C. E. Vulliamy. He was educated at the independent University College School and at Hertford College, Oxford, where he won an Open Scholarship, wrote a thesis on the Northern Ireland "Troubles" and graduated in Politics and Philosophy.

== Career ==
=== 1970s-1990s ===
In 1979, he joined Granada Television's current affairs programme World in Action, and in 1985 won a Royal Television Society (RTS) Award for a film about Northern Ireland. Another film about the IRA/INLA political status hunger strike of 1981 was banned by the Independent Broadcasting Authority because of a controversial shot of INLA hunger striker Patsy O'Hara, which World In Action editors refused to remove. Other programmes Vulliamy worked on included an investigation into neo-Nazi movements in Europe and Britain arming loyalist militias in Northern Ireland; a documentary about assisted dying for people who are terminally ill; a film about the last olive groves to be demolished and first stone laid for the Israeli West Bank settlement of Maale Adumim; an investigation into indigenous Aboriginal Australians dying from mining asbestos in New South Wales; and a special report on Ronald Reagan's 'Star Wars' space-based missile project, which included an interview with the inventor of the hydrogen bomb, Edward Teller. In 1986, he joined The Guardian as a reporter, and was later Rome correspondent covering the Mafia and Southern Europe, including the Mafia murders of judges Giovanni Falcone and Paolo Borsellino, and in Naples: the rise of the Camorra crime syndicates and their connections to the then Christian Democrat party and government leadership. He also covered the career and fall from grace of Diego Maradona.

=== 1990s-2000s ===
==== Bosnia ====
From there, he covered the Balkan wars, revealing a gulag of concentration camps. In August 1992, Vulliamy and British television reporter Penny Marshall managed to gain access to the notorious Omarska and Trnopolje camps, operated by the Bosnian Serbs for mainly Bosnian Muslim and Croat Catholic inmates. Their graphic accounts of the conditions of the prisoners were recorded for the documentary Omarska's survivors: Bosnia 1992. Discovery of the camps was credited with contributing to the establishment of the International Criminal Tribunal for the former Yugoslavia (ICTY) in The Hague. He remained in Bosnia for the bulk of the remainder of the war, covering ethnic cleansing from the inside, and the siege of Sarajevo.

For his coverage of the war in Bosnia, Vulliamy won most major awards in British journalism and became the first journalist since the Nuremberg trials to testify at an international war crimes tribunal, the ICTY. He testified for the prosecution in ten trials at the ICTY, including those of Bosnian Serb leaders Dr. Radovan Karadžić and General Ratko Mladić.

==== Other ====
In 1991, Vulliamy also covered the aftermath of the Iraqi invasion of Kuwait, revealing atrocities by Saddam Hussein's troops in the Shiite South.

In 1994–95, and again from 1997 to 2003, Vulliamy was based in Washington and later New York as U.S. Correspondent for The Guardian's sister paper, The Observer. In the United States, he covered the Oklahoma City bombing of 1995, and in its wake, investigated deep within the far-right militia movement. He covered US politics, society, culture and sports across the union, the transition from the presidency of Bill Clinton to George W. Bush. Later, he reported on the lynching of James Byrd in Jasper, Texas, and on its slipstream, penetrated the white supremacist backstory behind the killer's world, in jail and among fringe religious compounds. He was living in New York at the time of the 9/11 terrorist attacks in 2001 and covered the story and its aftermath, in the city and along the corridors of power. While based in New York, he reported from Mexico on narco-traffic, organised crime and the mass-murder of women in Ciudad Juárez; from Haiti on the regime of Raoul Cedras and the 1994 US intervention, from Jamaica on organised crime in Jamaica, from Cuba on the dissident movement and from Nicaragua.

Vulliamy covered the lead-up to the invasion of, and war in, Iraq from 2002 onwards. He clashed with his newspaper, The Observer, over its support for the invasion, often unable to place his stories about false intelligence and non-existence of weapons of mass destruction in the paper (see Official Secrets film below, 2019). He reported from Iraq several times from early 2003 to 2005, on civilian casualties of the invasion, and on the subsequent insurgency.

From 2003 onwards, Vulliamy has worked along the US-Mexican border, reporting on organised crime, narco-traffic, cartel wars, security and migration. This work led to his book Amexica: War Along the Borderline, which in 2013 won the coveted Ryszard Kapuściński Award – named in honor of the writer, creator and master of the genre. He was among the first reporters to reveal the laundering of proceeds of narco-traffic by mainstream high-street banks (Wachovia and HSBC) on a massive scale. Reviewing 'Amexica' in the New York Times, Tamara Jacoby wrote: "Vulliamy, with a mix of irony and pathos, writes like a latter-day Graham Greene — the detached foreign observer who has seen it all yet really cares".

=== Recent ===
His book The War is Dead, Long Live The War about the survivors of Bosnia's rape and concentration camps was shortlisted for the same Ryszard Kapuscinski prize in 2015. The book followed survivors of the concentration camps over 20 years after the war, examining the legacy of trauma, resilience and survival of genocide.

Vulliamy badly broke his leg in 2013, and wrote a detailed article from the patient's viewpoint about his prolonged treatment with the Ilizarov apparatus, an external frame that stretches the leg. As a result of the accident, he left the staff of The Guardian and The Observer newspapers in October 2016, after 31 years, to become a full-time author, journalist and film-researcher – but continues to work regularly as a reporter for The Guardian, The Observer and Guardian Films on narco-traffic, the US-Mexico border and the peace process between the Colombian government and the FARC.

Vulliamy also writes about football, music and painting. In 2014, he completed a book for Granta about Diego Velázquez's painting Las Meninas, Everything Is Happening: Journey Into A Painting, for Vulliamy's friend Michael Jacobs, who died suddenly of cancer before it was finished. In 2013, Vulliamy wrote liner notes for a CD box set of solo records by Robert Plant of Led Zeppelin and in 2017, contributed an essay to the book which accompanied the 50th anniversary edition, remixed by George Martin's son Giles, of The Beatles 'Sgt. Pepper's Lonely Hearts Club Band', for Apple Records.

In 2018 he published a memoir through music, When Words Fail: A Life with Music, War and Peace, also for Granta, published in the United States as 'Louder Than Bombs' by the University of Chicago Press. The book explores music and conflict, and features the last interview with B.B. King. In September 2022, the RTÉ Concert Orchestra - conducted by Ciarán Crilly with soloists and choir - premiered a Cantata about the Irish Civil War, 'Who'd Ever Think It Would Come To This?', for which Vulliamy wrote the libretto. The performance, with music composed by Anne-Marie O'Farrell, sold out to a standing ovation. Vulliamy sings in an occasional blues/rock band, "Age Against the Machine".

In 2019, Vulliamy was by played the actor Rhys Ifans in Gavin Hood's acclaimed Hollywood film Official Secrets about the case of Katharine Gun, a GCHQ agent who blew the whistle on illegal bugging of UN diplomats during the lead-up to the Iraq invasion of 2003, with Keira Knightley in the lead role. Vulliamy features in the film furious at censorship by his own paper of a story he filed during October–December 2002 from an inside CIA source, Mel Goodman, affirming that Iraq had no weapons of mass destruction, while intelligence was being 'cooked' by a special office in the Pentagon – and then locating the NSA secret agent, Frank Koza, who ordered the illegal bugging. Vulliamy has called Ifans' performance "my Alter Idem, more me than I am!".

In 2020, Vulliamy was made an Honorary Fellow of Goldsmiths' College, University of London. Accepting the fellowship, he called it "one of the great honours of my life", and urged media and journalism students to "get out there and give them hell".

Vulliamy is currently working in Ukraine, on resistance - military, musical and cultural - to the Russian invasion.

== Awards ==
Vulliamy was awarded several major prizes in British journalism for his coverage of the war in Bosnia and work on organised crime. Among his awards for newspaper reporting are: Granada Television's What The Papers Say Foreign Correspondent of the Year', 1992; British Press Awards International Reporter of the Year, 1992 and 1997; Amnesty International Media award 1992; and the James Cameron Award in 1994.

== Personal life ==
Vulliamy has two daughters. His sister Clara is an author of children's books. Vulliamy has been a vegetarian since the age of eight after he questioned what happens to sheep.

== Selected publications ==
- Seasons in Hell: Slaughter and Betrayal in Bosnia, Simon & Schuster, London, 1994. ISBN 9780671713454; Seasons in Hell: Understanding Bosnia's War, St Martins Press, New York, 1994. ISBN 978-0-312-11378-0
- (with David Leigh), Sleaze: The Corruption of Parliament, Fourth Estate, London, 1997. ISBN 978-1-85702-694-8
- Amexica: War Along the Borderline, Bodley Head, London, 2010. ISBN 978-1-84792-128-4; Farrar, Straus and Giroux, New York, 2010. ISBN 978-0-374-10441-2
- The War is Dead, Long Live the War: Bosnia: The Reckoning, Bodley Head, London, 2012. ISBN 978-1-84792-194-9
- (with Michael Jacobs), Everything is Happening: Journey into a Painting, Granta, London, 2014.
- When Words Fail: A Life with Music, War and Peace, Granta, London, 2018. ISBN 9781783783366
- Louder Than Bombs: A Life with Music, War, and Peace, University of Chicago Press, Chicago, 2020. ISBN 9780226715407
