= Peace enforcement =

Use of military force to compel peace in a conflict

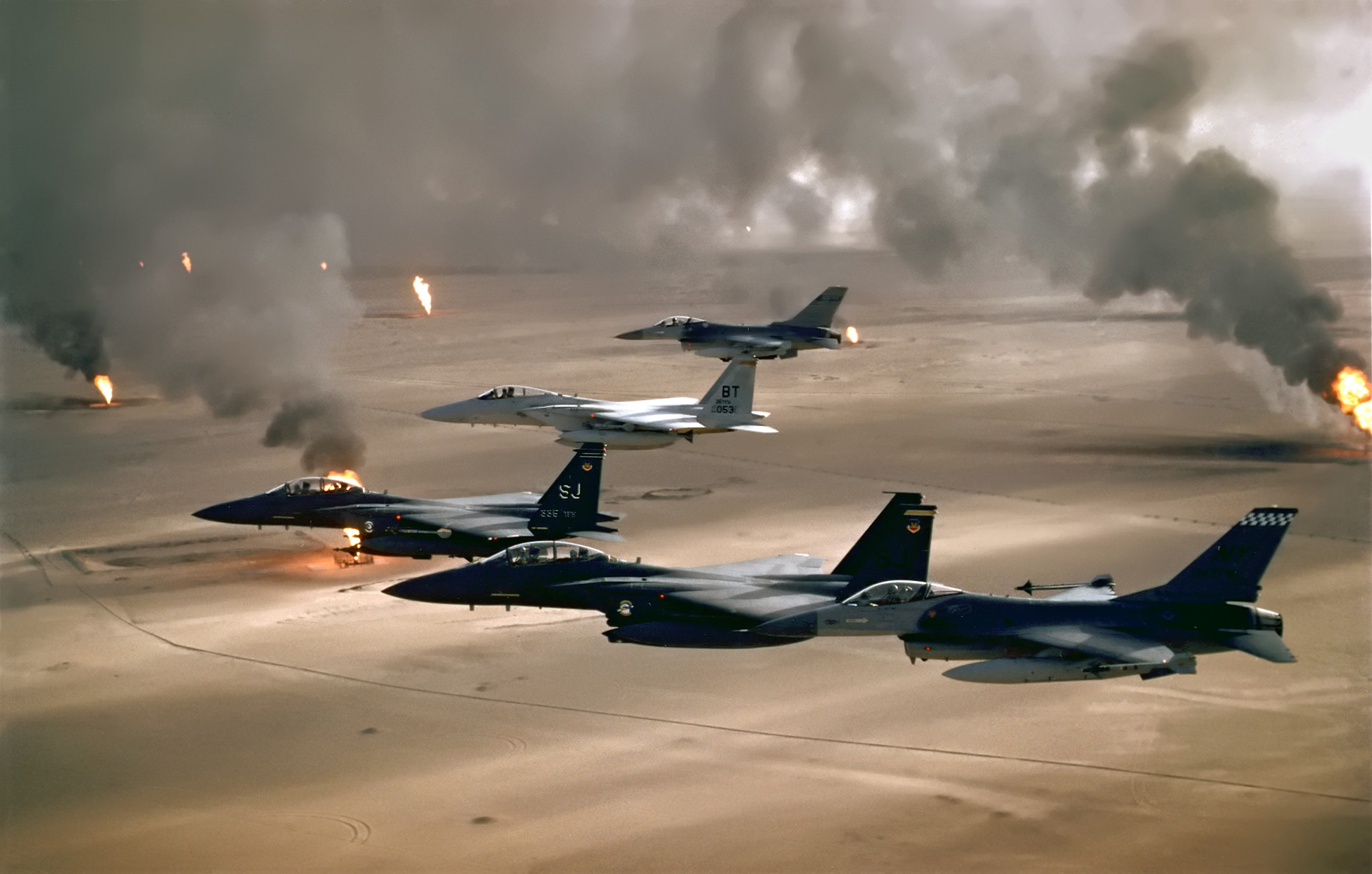
The Gulf War is an example of UN enforcement of its resolution mandating the withdrawal of Iraqi troops from Kuwait in 1991

Peace enforcement is the use of various tactics, most notably military force to compel peace in a conflict, generally against the will of combatants. Peace enforcement missions permit the use of non-defensive armed force, unlike peacekeeping operations. Only the United Nations, through its Security Council per Chapter VII of its charter, has the ability to authorize peace enforcement missions.

Peace enforcement differs from peacekeeping in that peace enforcement activities are generally used to create a peace from a broken ceasefire, or to enforce a peace demanded by the United Nations. Peace enforcement requires more military force than peacekeeping, and is consequently carried out by heavily armed forces. However achieving lasting peace through peace enforcement is limited, as such missions do not address the underlying problems which caused conflict. While peacekeeping missions utilize personnel from several countries, peace enforcement forces often originate from one state or a small coalition of states.

Perhaps the two most prominent examples of peace enforcement are the Korean War and the Gulf War. In both cases, a country invaded another as part of an illegal war of aggression, only to be repulsed by a UN military coalition.

== Peace Enforcement Missions ==
Notable Peace Enforcement Missions Include:

The Korean War took place between 1950-1953, the UN was involved in this peace enforcement mission by enforcing peace through military engagement. Establishing Chapter VII of the UN Charter allows the UN Security Council to authorize military action when peace is threatened. Other examples of peace enforcement missions could include, the Gulf War the primary "peace operation" involved was led by the UN and involved the international community. They sought to enforce Iraqi withdrawal via UN Security Council resolutions and international condemnation. However, these measures failed, leading to the launch of Operation Desert Storm, a military coalition campaign to liberate Kuwait. NATO's intervention in Kosovo in 1999, is seen as an example of peace enforcement despite not being directly sanctioned by the UN Security Council.

=== Africa ===
The United Nations and African Union have both executed peace enforcement missions in Africa. The African Union undertakes peace enforcement operations through utilizing the African Standby Force.

The United Nations Security Council often proposes peace enforcement mission partnerships to the African Union for authorization, and the African Union must request permission from the Security Council to execute peace enforcement operations. The United Nations has relied on the African Union to counter conflict outbreaks and enforce stability. The United Nations is then tasked with peacetime consolidation.

The UN Stabilization Mission to the Democratic Republic of the Congo was a peace enforcement mission targeting armed rebel groups such as M23.

=== Middle East and North Africa ===
Operation Unified Protector was a peace enforcement operation executed in Libya during the 2011 Libyan Civil War.

== Criticisms of Peace Enforcement ==
Critics of peace enforcement using United Nations peacekeeping forces include infringement on UN peacekeeping ethical standards of impartiality, intervention violating standards to only enforce an existing peace, and the use of non-defensive force. Distinguishing between operations conducted by the United Nations versus those which have been authorized by the United Nations Security Council has been a proposed solution. However, the use of UN peacekeeping forces for peace enforcement missions remains under scrutiny, and critics argue that regional organizations such as the African Union and the Arab League should be tasked with the execution of enforcement missions.

The United Nations has proposed peace enforcement missions as a means to combat intrastate conflicts in countries such as Ethiopia, Cameroon, Sudan, Niger, Burkina Faso, and Mali. However, these countries have relied upon internal conflict resolution tactics and have not requested for enforcement operations to be conducted.

== See also ==
- Pacification
- Peacekeeping
- Peacemaking
- An Agenda for Peace
- United Nations Force Intervention Brigade
