= Simo Drljača =

Bosnian war criminal

- Симо Дрљача
- Born: 6 August 1947; Bosanska Krupa, SR Bosnia and Herzegovina, Yugoslavia
- Died: 10 July 1997 (aged 49); Gradina, Prijedor, Bosnia and Herzegovina
- Cause of death: Shot by SFOR troops while resisting arrest
- Resting place: Banja Luka
- Occupation: police officer

Simo Drljača (Serbo-Croatian Cyrillic: Симо Дрљача; 6 August 1947 – 10 July 1997) was an indicted war criminal, police chief and member of the crisis staff of the municipality of Prijedor during the Bosnian War. On 10 July 1997 British special forces serving with the North Atlantic Treaty Organisation-led Stabilisation Force attempted to arrest Drljača in northwestern Bosnia, and when he fired at them, slightly wounding one, they returned fire and killed him.

== Early life and career ==
Simo Drljača was born on 6 August 1947 at Bosanska Krupa in the Socialist Republic of Bosnia and Herzegovina, Socialist Federal Republic of Yugoslavia. On 30 April 1992 he was appointed the chief of the public security station for the municipality of Prijedor. He was indicted for the crime of genocide by the International Criminal Tribunal for the former Yugoslavia in 1996. The indictment was amended in 1997.
