= Bosnian War =

1992–1995 armed conflict in Bosnia and Herzegovina

- Part of the Yugoslav wars
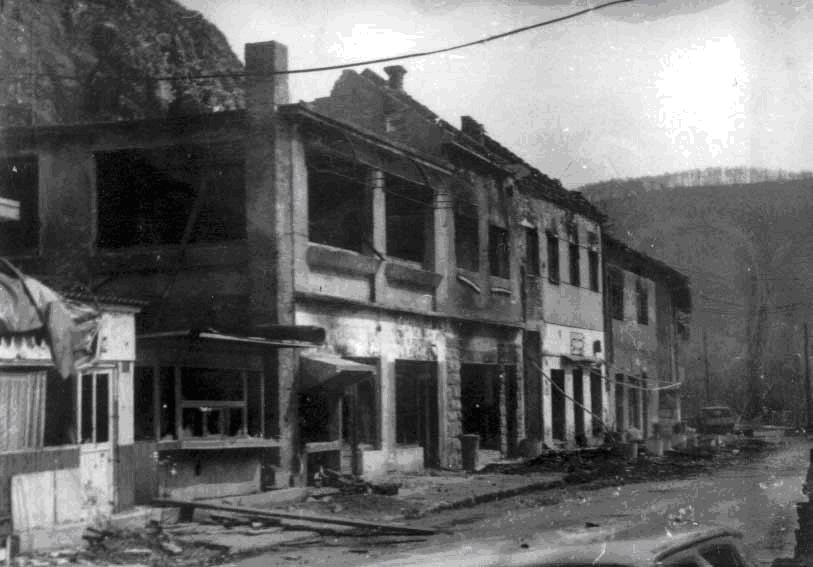
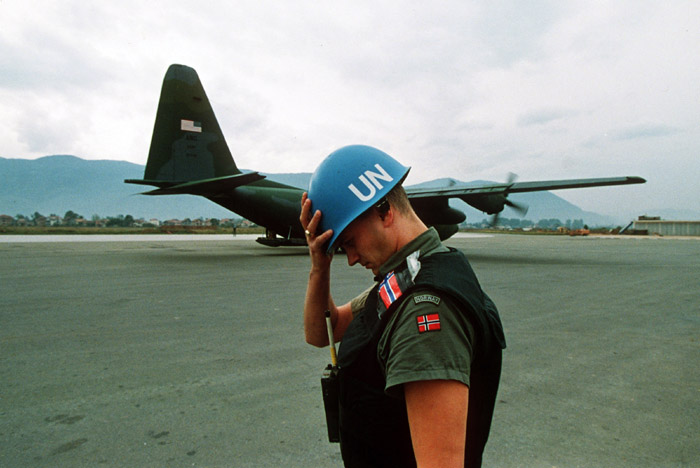
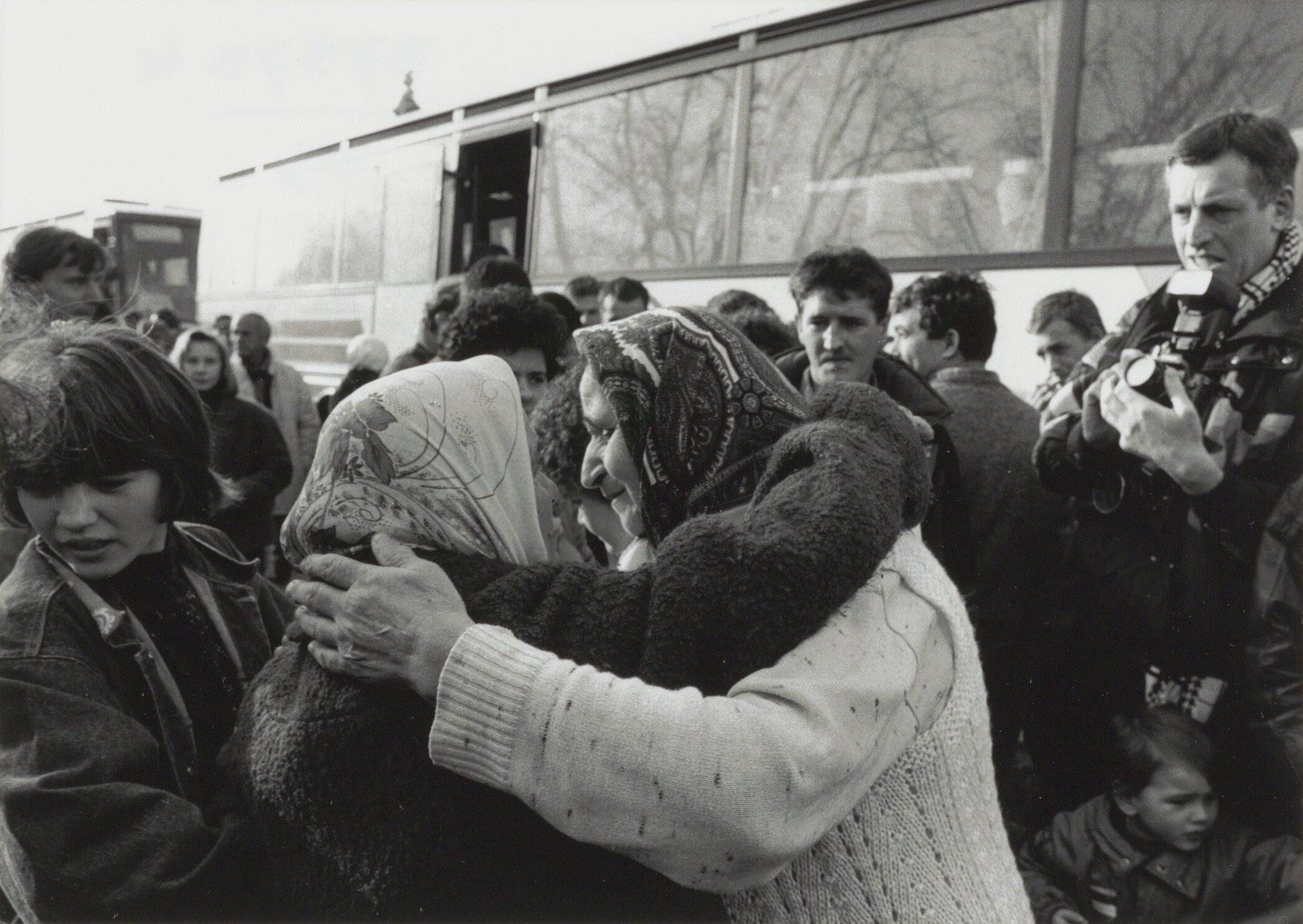
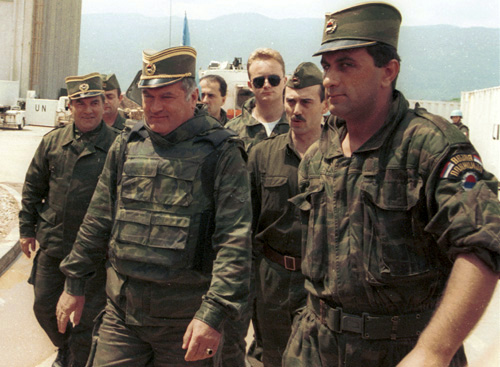
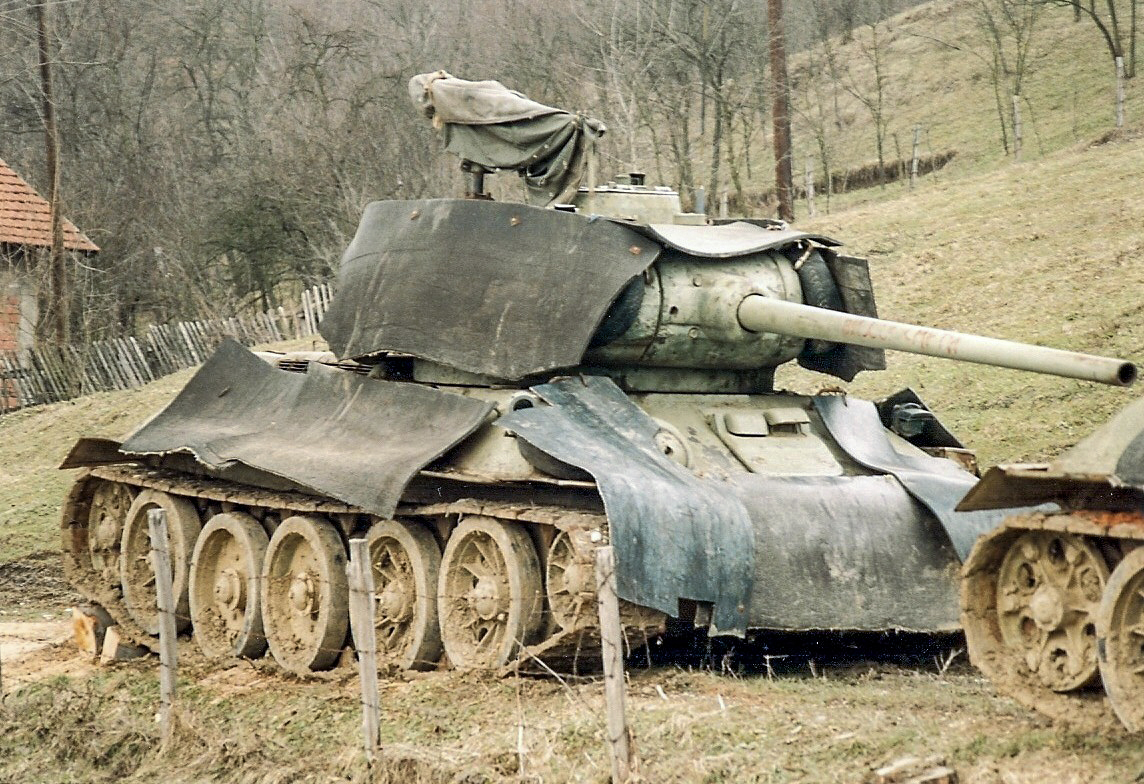
- Clockwise from top left: The Executive Council Building burns after being hit by tank fire in Sarajevo; Bosanska Krupa in 1992; Bosnian refugees reunited in a military camp; Serbian T-34 tank being drawn away from the frontline near Doboj in spring of 1996; Ratko Mladić with Army of Republika Srpska officers; A Norwegian UN peacekeeper in Sarajevo during the siege in 1992
Date	6 April 1992 – 21 November 1995 (3 years, 7 months, 2 weeks and 6 days)
Location	Bosnia and Herzegovina
Result	Military stalemate; Dayton agreement signed; Over 101,000 dead, largely Bosniaks.; Deployment of NATO-led forces to oversee the peace agreement.; Establishment of the Office of the High Representative to oversee the civilian implementation of the peace agreement.
Territorial changes	International recognition of Bosnia and Herzegovina as a sovereign state; Internal partition of Bosnia and Herzegovina according to the Dayton Accords.; Republika Srpska is recognised as one of two entities that form Bosnia and Herzegovina; Croatian Republic of Herzeg-Bosnia is abolished in 1996

Belligerents
Until October 1992: Bosnia and Herzegovina; Herzeg-Bosnia; Croatia		Until May 1992: FR Yugoslavia (Note: After all former Yugoslav federal republics except Serbia and Montenegro declared independence, the two declared the creation of a new country – the Federal Republic of Yugoslavia – on 27 April 1992, disbanding the JNA soon afterwards. Serb-controlled units of the JNA participated in combat operations throughout 1991 and up to May 1992 in support of the Republic of Serbian Krajina.); Republika Srpska; Republic of Serbian Krajina
October 1992–94: Bosnia and Herzegovina	October 1992–94: Herzeg-Bosnia; Croatia	May 1992–94: Republika Srpska; Republic of Serbian Krajina; Western Bosnia (from 1993)
1994–95: Bosnia and Herzegovina^{b} Herzeg-Bosnia; Croatia		1994–95: Republika Srpska; Republic of Serbian Krajina; Western Bosnia

Commanders and leaders
(Republic of Bosnia and Herzegovina) Alija Izetbegović (Republic of Bosnia and Herzegovina) Haris Silajdžić (Republic of Bosnia and Herzegovina) Sefer Halilović (Republic of Bosnia and Herzegovina) Rasim Delić (Republic of Bosnia and Herzegovina) Enver Hadžihasanović (Republic of Bosnia and Herzegovina) Atif Dudaković...and others	(Croatia) Franjo Tuđman; (Croatia) Gojko Šušak; (Croatia) Janko Bobetko; (Croatian Republic of Herzeg-Bosnia) Mate Boban; (Croatian Republic of Herzeg-Bosnia) Dario Kordić; (Croatian Republic of Herzeg-Bosnia) Bruno Stojić; (Croatian Republic of Herzeg-Bosnia) Milivoj Petković...and others	(Federal Republic of Yugoslavia) Slobodan Milošević; (Republika Srpska (1992–1995)) Radovan Karadžić; (Republika Srpska (1992–1995)) Momčilo Krajišnik; (Republika Srpska (1992–1995)) Biljana Plavšić; (Republika Srpska (1992–1995)) Ratko Mladić...and others

Strength
ARBiH: 110,000 troops 110,000 reserves 40 tanks 30 APCs	HVO: 45,000–50,000 troops 75 tanks 50 APCs; 200 artillery pieces HV: 15,000 troops	1992: JNA; 1992–95: VRS: 80,000 troops 300 tanks 700 APCs; 800 artillery pieces NOZB: 4,000–5,000 troops

Casualties and losses
(Republic of Bosnia and Herzegovina) 30,906 soldiers killed (Republic of Bosnia and Herzegovina) 31,107 civilians killed	(Croatian Republic of Herzeg-Bosnia) 5,919 soldiers killed (Croatian Republic of Herzeg-Bosnia) 2,484 civilians killed	(Republika Srpska (1992–1995)) 20,775 soldiers killed (Republika Srpska (1992–1995)) 4,178 civilians killed
- 571 people of other ethnicities (including 101 soldiers) killed and another 5,100 killed whose ethnicity and status are unstated
- ^{a} The Army of the Republic of Bosnia and Herzegovina was mainly staffed by Bosniaks. Notable non-Bosniak high-ranking individuals included Jovan Divjak, a Bosnian Serb.^{b} In 1994, the Army of the Republic of Bosnia and Herzegovina joined cause with the Bosnian Croat forces owing to the Washington Agreement.

The Bosnian War (Note: Also known as the "Aggression on Bosnia and Herzegovina" (Serbo-Croatian: Agresija na Bosnu i Hercegovinu), the "Defensive-Liberation War" (Serbo-Croatian: Odbrambeno-oslobodilački rat), the "Defensive-Patriotic War" (Serbo-Croatian: Obrambeno-otadžbinski rat), the "Homeland War [in Bosnia and Herzegovina]" (Serbo-Croatian: Domovinski rat [u Bosni i Hercegovini]) and the "Civil War in Bosnia and Herzegovina" (Serbo-Croatian: Građanski rat u Bosni i Hercegovini), depending on each belligerent's point of view.) (Serbo-Croatian: Rat u Bosni i Hercegovini / Рат у Босни и Херцеговини) was an armed conflict that took place in Bosnia and Herzegovina, from 1992 until 1995. Following several earlier violent incidents, the war is commonly seen as having started on 6 April 1992 when the newly independent Republic of Bosnia and Herzegovina was internationally recognized. It ended on 21 November 1995 when the Dayton Accords were initialed. The main belligerents were the forces of the government of the Republic of Bosnia and Herzegovina, and those of the breakaway proto-states of the Republic of Herzeg-Bosnia and the Republika Srpska which were led and supplied by Croatia and Serbia, respectively.

The war was part of the breakup of Yugoslavia. Following the Slovenian and Croatian secessions from the Socialist Federal Republic of Yugoslavia in 1991, the multi-ethnic Socialist Republic of Bosnia and Herzegovina – which was inhabited by mainly Muslim Bosniaks (44%), Orthodox Serbs (32.5%) and Catholic Croats (17%) – passed a referendum for independence on 29 February 1992. Political representatives of the Bosnian Serbs boycotted the referendum and rejected its outcome. Anticipating the outcome of the referendum, the Bosnian Serb leadership proclaimed the "Republic of the Serb People of Bosnia and Herzegovina" on 9 January 1992 (Republika srpskoga naroda Bosne i Hercegovine), effectively laying the foundation of today's Republika Srpska.

Following the independence declaration of the Republic of Bosnia and Herzegovina on 1 March 1992, the Bosnian Serbs, led by Radovan Karadžić, supported by the government of the president of Serbia Slobodan Milošević, and supplied by the Yugoslav People's Army (JNA), mobilized their forces inside Bosnia and Herzegovina and over the following months seized control of approximately 70% of the country's territory in a campaign characterized by widespread ethnic cleansing of Bosnian Croats and Bosniaks. (Note: Also known as Bosnian Muslims.)

The conflict was initially between Yugoslav Army units in Bosnia which later transformed into the Army of Republika Srpska (VRS) on the one side, and the Army of the Republic of Bosnia and Herzegovina (ARBiH), predominantly composed of Bosniaks, and the Croat forces in the Croatian Defence Council (HVO) on the other side. Tensions between Croats and Bosniaks increased throughout late 1992, resulting in the escalation of the Croat–Bosniak War in early 1993. The Bosnian War was characterised by bitter fighting, indiscriminate shelling of cities and towns, ethnic cleansing, and systematic mass rape, mainly perpetrated by Serb, and to a lesser extent, Croat and Bosniak forces. Events such as the siege of Sarajevo and the July 1995 Srebrenica genocide later became iconic of the conflict. The massacre of over 8,000 Bosniak males by Serb forces in Srebrenica is the only incident in Europe to have been recognized as a genocide since World War II.

The Serbs, although initially militarily superior due to the weapons and resources provided by the JNA, eventually lost momentum as the Bosniaks and Croats allied against the Republika Srpska in 1994 with the creation of the Federation of Bosnia and Herzegovina following the Washington Agreement. Pakistan ignored the United Nations' ban on the supply of arms and airlifted anti-tank missiles to the Bosnian Muslims, while after the Srebrenica and Markale massacres, NATO intervened in 1995 with Operation Deliberate Force, targeting the positions of the Army of the Republika Srpska, which proved key in ending the war. After cease-fires had previously been agreed on September 14 and October 5, 1995, peace negotiations were held in Dayton, Ohio, and the war ended when the Dayton Accords were initialed on 21 November 1995.

By early 2008, the International Criminal Tribunal for the former Yugoslavia had convicted forty-five Serbs, twelve Croats, and four Bosniaks of war crimes in connection with the war in Bosnia. Estimates suggest over 100,000 people were killed during the war. Over 2.2 million people were displaced, making it, at the time, the most violent conflict in Europe since the end of World War II. In addition, an estimated 12,000–50,000 women were raped, mainly carried out by Serb forces, with most of the victims being Bosniak women.

== Chronology ==
Clashes between Bosniaks, Croats, and Serbs in Bosnia started in late February 1992, and "full-scale hostilities had broken out by 6 April", the same day the US and European Economic Community (EEC) recognised Bosnia and Herzegovina. Misha Glenny gives a date of 22 March, Tom Gallagher gives 2 April, while Mary Kaldor, and Laura Silber and Allan Little give 6 April. Philip Hammond claimed the most common view is that the war started on 6 April.

Serbs consider the Sarajevo wedding shooting, when a groom's father was killed on the second day of the Bosnian independence referendum, 1 March 1992, as the first death of the war. The Sijekovac killings of Serbs took place on 26 March and the Bijeljina massacre on 1–2 April. On 5 April, after protesters approached a barricade, a demonstrator was killed by Serb forces.

The war was formally brought to an end by the General Framework Agreement for Peace in Bosnia and Herzegovina, negotiated at Wright-Patterson Air Force Base in Dayton, Ohio between 1 and 21 November 1995 when the Agreement was initialed, and was formally signed in Paris on 14 December. Cease-fire agreements had previously been agreed on September 14 and October 5, 1995.

== Background ==
=== Breakup of Yugoslavia ===
The war came about as a result of the breakup of the Socialist Federal Republic of Yugoslavia. A crisis emerged in Yugoslavia as a result of the weakening of the confederation system at the end of the Cold War. In Yugoslavia, the national communist party, the League of Communists of Yugoslavia, lost ideological potency. Meanwhile, ethnic nationalism experienced a renaissance in the 1980s after violence in Kosovo. While the goal of Serbian nationalists was the centralisation of Yugoslavia, other nationalities aspired to the federalisation and the decentralisation of the state.

Bosnia and Herzegovina, a historically multi-ethnic region with medieval statehood and later Ottoman and Austro-Hungarian rule, has historically been ethnically diverse. According to the 1991 census, 44% of the population considered themselves Muslim (Bosniak), 33% Serb, and 17% Croat, with 6% describing themselves as Yugoslav.

In March 1989, the crisis in Yugoslavia deepened after the adoption of amendments to the Serbian Constitution allowing the government of Serbia to dominate the autonomous provinces of Kosovo and Vojvodina. Until then, Kosovo and Vojvodina's decision-making was independent, and each autonomous province had a vote at the Yugoslav federal level. Serbia, under newly elected President Slobodan Milošević, gained control over three out of eight votes in the Yugoslav presidency. With additional votes from Montenegro, Serbia was thus able to heavily influence the decisions of the federal government. This situation led to objections from the other republics and calls for the reform of the Yugoslav federation.

At the 14th Extraordinary Congress of the League of Communists of Yugoslavia, on 20 January 1990, the delegations of the republics could not agree on the main issues facing the Yugoslav federation. As a result, the Slovene and Croatian delegates left the Congress. The Slovene delegation, headed by Milan Kučan, demanded democratic changes and a looser federation, while the Serbian delegation, headed by Milošević, opposed it.

In the first multi-party election in Bosnia and Herzegovina, in November 1990, votes were cast largely according to ethnicity, leading to the success of the Bosniak Party of Democratic Action (SDA), the Serb Democratic Party (SDS), and the Croatian Democratic Union (HDZ BiH).

As a result, political power was distributed along ethnic lines. The president of the Presidency of the Socialist Republic of Bosnia and Herzegovina was a Bosniak, the president of the Parliament was a Serb, and the prime minister was a Croat. Similar patterns of nationalist and separatist party dominance emerged in other republics, including Croatia and Slovenia.

Throughout 1990, preparations under the RAM Plan were developed by the SDB and a group of selected Serb officers of the Yugoslav People's Army (JNA), with the purpose of organizing Serbs outside Serbia, consolidating control of the fledgling SDS parties, and the positioning of arms and ammunition. The plan was meant to prepare the framework for a third Yugoslavia in which all Serbs with their territories would live together in the same state. According to some sources, the RAM plan was crafted in the 1980s. Its existence was leaked in September 1991 by Ante Marković, the Prime Minister of Yugoslavia, an ethnic Croat from Bosnia and Herzegovina. The existence and possible implementation of it alarmed the Bosnian government. Journalist Giuseppe Zaccaria summarised a meeting of Serb army officers in Belgrade in 1991, reporting they had adopted an explicit policy to target women and children as the vulnerable portion of the Muslim social structure.

=== Beginning of the Yugoslav Wars ===
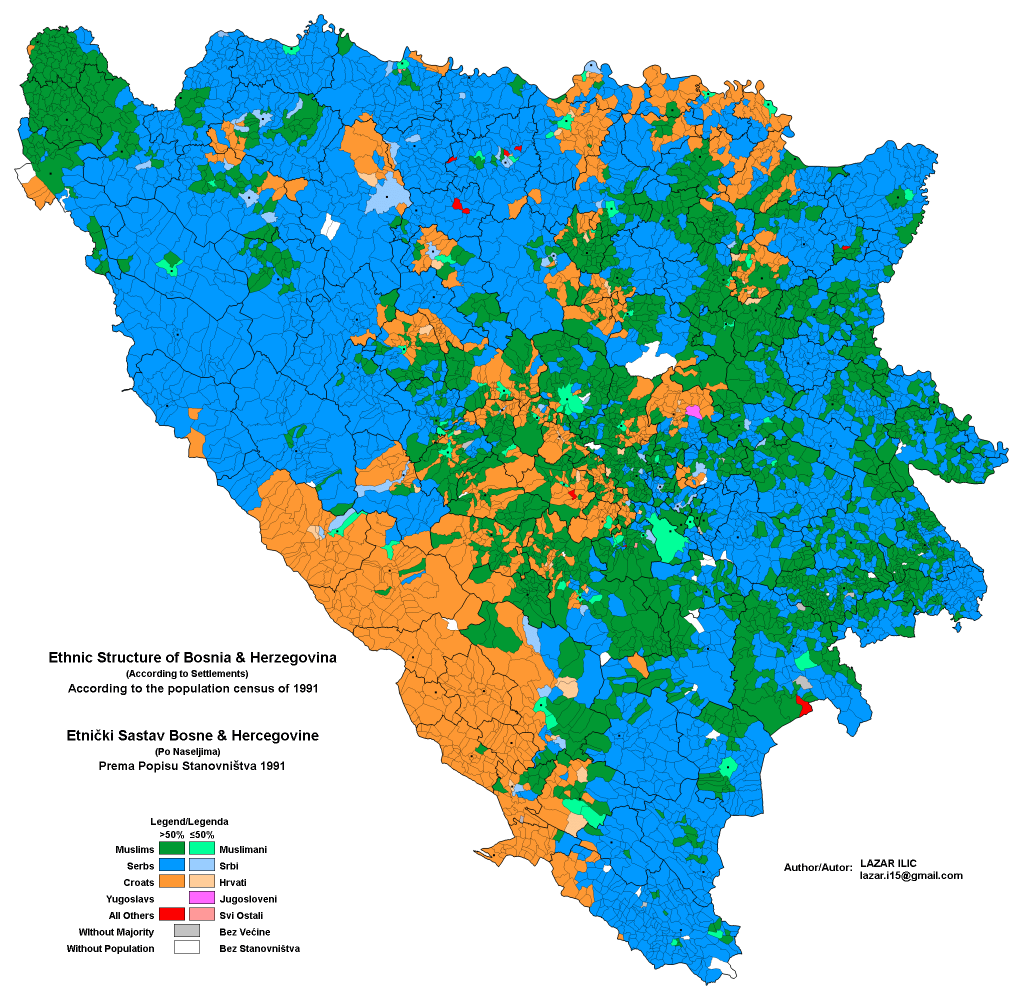
Ethnic map of Bosnia and Herzegovina in 1991 Bosniaks Serbs Croats

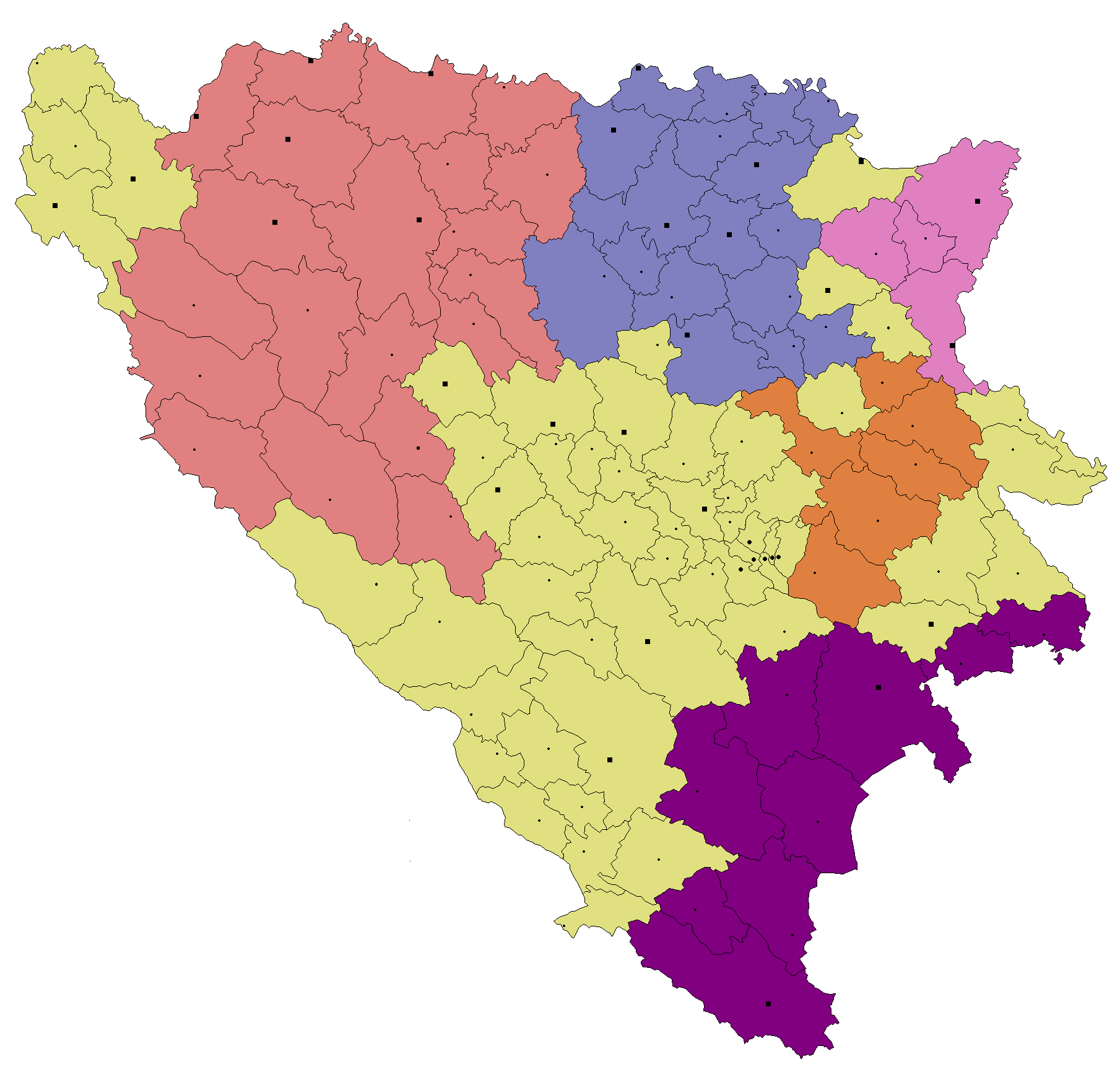
Serbian Autonomous Oblasts in November 1991

Meetings were held in early 1991 between the leaders of the six Yugoslav republics, and the two autonomous regions, to discuss the crisis. The Serbian leadership favoured a federal solution, whereas the Croatian and Slovenian leadership favoured an alliance of sovereign states. Bosnian leader Alija Izetbegović proposed an asymmetrical federation in February, where Slovenia and Croatia would maintain loose ties with the four remaining republics. Shortly after, he changed his position and opted for a sovereign Bosnia as a prerequisite for such a federation.

On 25 March, Croatian President Franjo Tuđman and Serbian President Slobodan Milošević held a meeting in Karađorđevo. The meeting was controversial due to claims by some Yugoslav politicians that the two presidents agreed to the partition of Bosnia and Herzegovina. At the same time, following a year of the Log Revolution in areas of Croatia with substantial ethnic Serb population, the armed clashes began to result in casualties.

On 6 June, Izetbegović and Macedonian president Kiro Gligorov proposed a weak confederation between Croatia, Slovenia, and a federation of the other four republics. That was rejected by the Milošević administration.

On 25 June 1991, Slovenia and Croatia declared independence. An armed conflict in Slovenia ensued, while the conflict in Croatia escalated into a full-scale war involving the Republic of Serbian Krajina. The Yugoslav People's Army (JNA) abandoned efforts to reassert control over Slovenia in early July and redeployed its forces to support Serb rebels in Croatia. During this period, the JNA also used Bosnia and Herzegovina as a staging ground for attacks against Croatian territory.

In July 1991, representatives of the Serb Democratic Party (SDS), including SDS president Radovan Karadžić, Muhamed Filipović, and Adil Zulfikarpašić from the Muslim Bosniak Organisation (MBO), drafted an agreement known as the Zulfikarpašić–Karadžić agreement. The agreement proposed keeping the SR Bosnia and Herzegovina within a federal state alongside SR Serbia and SR Montenegro, effectively keeping the republic within a "rump Yugoslavia." The agreement was denounced by Croat political parties and rejected by the leadership of the Party of Democratic Action (SDA). Izetbegović was informed of the talks, but his administration viewed the initiative as an effort to undermine the government and dismissed the agreement as a false solution that compromised Bosnian sovereignty.

In August 1991, the European Economic Community hosted a conference in an attempt to prevent Bosnia and Herzegovina from sliding into war. On 25 September 1991, the United Nations Security Council passed Resolution 713, imposing an arms embargo on all former Yugoslav territories. The embargo had little effect on the JNA and Serb forces, while Croat forces had already built up a considerable arsenal from seized JNA equipment and could smuggle other weaponry across its borders with neighboring countries. The embargo had a significant impact in Bosnia and Herzegovina at the start of the Bosnian War. The Serb forces inherited the armaments and the equipment of the JNA, while the Croat and Bosniak forces obtained arms through Croatia in violation of the embargo.

On 3 September 1991 four Bosniaks were ambushed by a group of Serb nationalists as their car was passing through the village of Kravica near Bratunac, in eastern Bosnia and Herzegovina. Two Bosniaks were killed, while the other two survived with injuries. The incident echoed local ethnic killings in World War II and aroused panic among both the local Serb and Bosniak populations and was the first serious episode of ethnically motivated violence in Bosnia since World War II.

Between September and November 1991, the SDS organised the creation of six "Serb Autonomous Regions" (SAOs). This was in response to the Bosniaks' steps toward seceding from Yugoslavia. Similar steps were taken by the Bosnian Croats.

On 19 September 1991, the JNA moved extra troops to the area around the city of Mostar. This was protested by the local government. On 20 September 1991, the JNA transferred troops to the front at Vukovar via the Višegrad region of northeastern Bosnia. In response, local Croats and Bosniaks set up barricades and machine-gun posts. They halted a column of 60 JNA tanks, but were dispersed by force the following day. More than 1,000 people had to flee the area. This action, nearly seven months before the start of the Bosnian War, caused the first casualties of the Yugoslav Wars in Bosnia. In the first days of October, the JNA attacked and leveled the Croat village of Ravno in eastern Herzegovina, on their way to attack Dubrovnik in southern Croatia.

On 6 October 1991, Bosnian president Alija Izetbegović gave a televised proclamation of neutrality, it included the statement "it is not our war". Izetbegović made a statement before the Bosnian parliament on 14 October with regard to the JNA: "Do not do anything against the Army. (...) the presence of the Army is a stabilizing factor to us, and we need that Army... Until now, we did not have problems with the Army, and we will not have problems later." Izetbegović had a testy exchange with Bosnian Serb leader Radovan Karadžić in parliament on that day. After Karadžić wagered that the Bosnian Muslims could not defend themselves if a state of war developed, Izetbegović observed that he found Karadžić's manner and speech offensive and it explained why the Bosniaks felt unwelcome, that his tone might explain why the others federated by Yugoslavia felt repelled, and that the threats of Karadžić were unworthy of the Serbian people.

=== Final political crisis ===
On 15 October 1991, the parliament of the Socialist Republic of Bosnia and Herzegovina in Sarajevo passed a “Memorandum on the Sovereignty of Bosnia-Herzegovina” by a simple majority. The Memorandum was hotly contested by the Bosnian Serb members of parliament, arguing the Constitution required procedural safeguards and a two-thirds majority for such issues. The Memorandum was debated anyway, leading to a boycott of the parliament by the Bosnian Serbs, and the legislation was passed. The Serb political representatives proclaimed the Assembly of the Serb People of Bosnia and Herzegovina on 24 October 1991, declaring that the Serb people wished to remain in Yugoslavia. The Party of Democratic Action (SDA), led by Alija Izetbegović, was determined to pursue independence and was supported by Europe and the US The SDS made it clear that if independence was declared, Serbs would secede as it was their right to exercise self-determination.

The HDZ BiH was established as a branch of the ruling party in Croatia, the Croatian Democratic Union (HDZ). While it called for the independence of the country, there was a split in the party with some advocating secession of Croat-majority areas. In November 1991, the Croat leadership organised autonomous communities in areas with a Croat majority. On 12 November 1991, the Croatian Community of Bosnian Posavina was established in Bosanski Brod. It covered 8 municipalities in northern Bosnia. On 18 November 1991, the Croatian Community of Herzeg-Bosnia was established in Mostar. Mate Boban was chosen as its president. Its founding document said: “The Community will respect the democratically elected government of the Republic of Bosnia and Herzegovina for as long as exists the state independence of Bosnia and Herzegovina in relation to the former, or any other, Yugoslavia”.

Borisav Jović's memoirs show that on 5 December 1991 Milošević ordered the JNA troops in BiH to be reorganised and its non-Bosnian personnel to be withdrawn, in case recognition would result in the perception of the JNA as a foreign force; Bosnian Serbs would remain to form the nucleus of a Bosnian Serb army. Accordingly, by the end of the month only 10–15% of the personnel in the JNA in BiH were from outside the republic. Silber and Little note that Milošević secretly ordered all Bosnian-born JNA soldiers to be transferred to BiH. Jović's memoirs suggest that Milošević planned for an attack on Bosnia well in advance.

On 19 December 1991, a secret document entitled “Instructions for Organization and Activity of Organs for the Serb People in Bosnia and Herzegovina in Extraordinary Circumstances” (Variant A/B Instructions) was issued by the main board of the SDS and distributed to SDS leaders the next day. The instructions contained two variants: Variant A and Variant B. Variant A planned for a takeover of municipalities where Serbs formed a majority and was to be implemented immediately upon adoption of the document. Conversely, Variant B applied to municipalities where Serbs formed a minority and was adopted only on 14 February 1992, after a Bosnian independence referendum was called. Variant A called for the establishment of municipal crisis committees as ad hoc municipal governments which would be headed by the president of the municipal assembly or the chairman of the municipal executive board with a small number of members charged with making expedited decisions, and coordinating activities with the army, police and other higher institutions. In Variant B, the crisis committee would be headed by the president of the SDS municipal board. The Instructions were received and fully or partially implemented in several municipalities.

On 9 January 1992, the Bosnian Serbs proclaimed the “Republic of the Serbian People in Bosnia-Herzegovina” (SR BiH, later Republika Srpska), but did not officially declare independence. The Arbitration Commission of the Peace Conference on Yugoslavia in its 11 January 1992 Opinion No. 4 on Bosnia and Herzegovina stated that the independence of Bosnia and Herzegovina should not be recognised because the country had not yet held a referendum on independence.

In early January 1992, fighting in Croatia finally subsided after the Vance plan led to a ceasefire, with an implementation agreement signed in Sarajevo.

On 25 January 1992, an hour after the session of parliament was adjourned, the parliament called for a referendum on independence on 29 February and 1 March. The debate had ended after Serb deputies withdrew after the majority Bosniak–Croat delegates turned down a motion that the referendum question be placed before the not yet established Council of National Equality. The referendum proposal was adopted in the form as proposed by Muslim deputies, in the absence of SDS members. As Burg and Shoup note, “the decision placed the Bosnian government and the Serbs on a collision course”. The upcoming referendum caused international concern in February.

The Croatian War would result in United Nations Security Council Resolution 743 on 21 February 1992, which created the United Nations Protection Force (UNPROFOR). During talks in Lisbon on 21–22 February a “Statement of Principles” was presented by EC mediator José Cutileiro, which proposed an independent state of Bosnia consisting of three ethnic “constituent units”. The proposal was rejected by the Bosniak leadership on 25 February.

On 28 February 1992, the Bosnian Serb assembly adopted a constitution for the SR BiH, which declared that its territory included “the territories of the Serbian Autonomous Regions and Districts and of other Serbian ethnic entities in Bosnia and Herzegovina, including the regions in which the Serbian people remained in the minority due to the genocide conducted against it in World War II” and declared the Republic to be a part of Yugoslavia.

The Bosnian Serb assembly members advised Serbs to boycott the referendum held on 29 February and 1 March 1992. The referendum turnout was reported as 63.4%, with 99.7% of voters voting in favour of independence (implying that Bosnian Serbs, who made up approximately 31.3% of the population, had largely boycotted it). On 3 March, in the Bosnian parliament, Izetbegović declared Bosnia and Herzegovina to be an independent state, which was subsequently ratified by the parliament (in absence of the SDS delegates).

=== March 1992 unrest ===
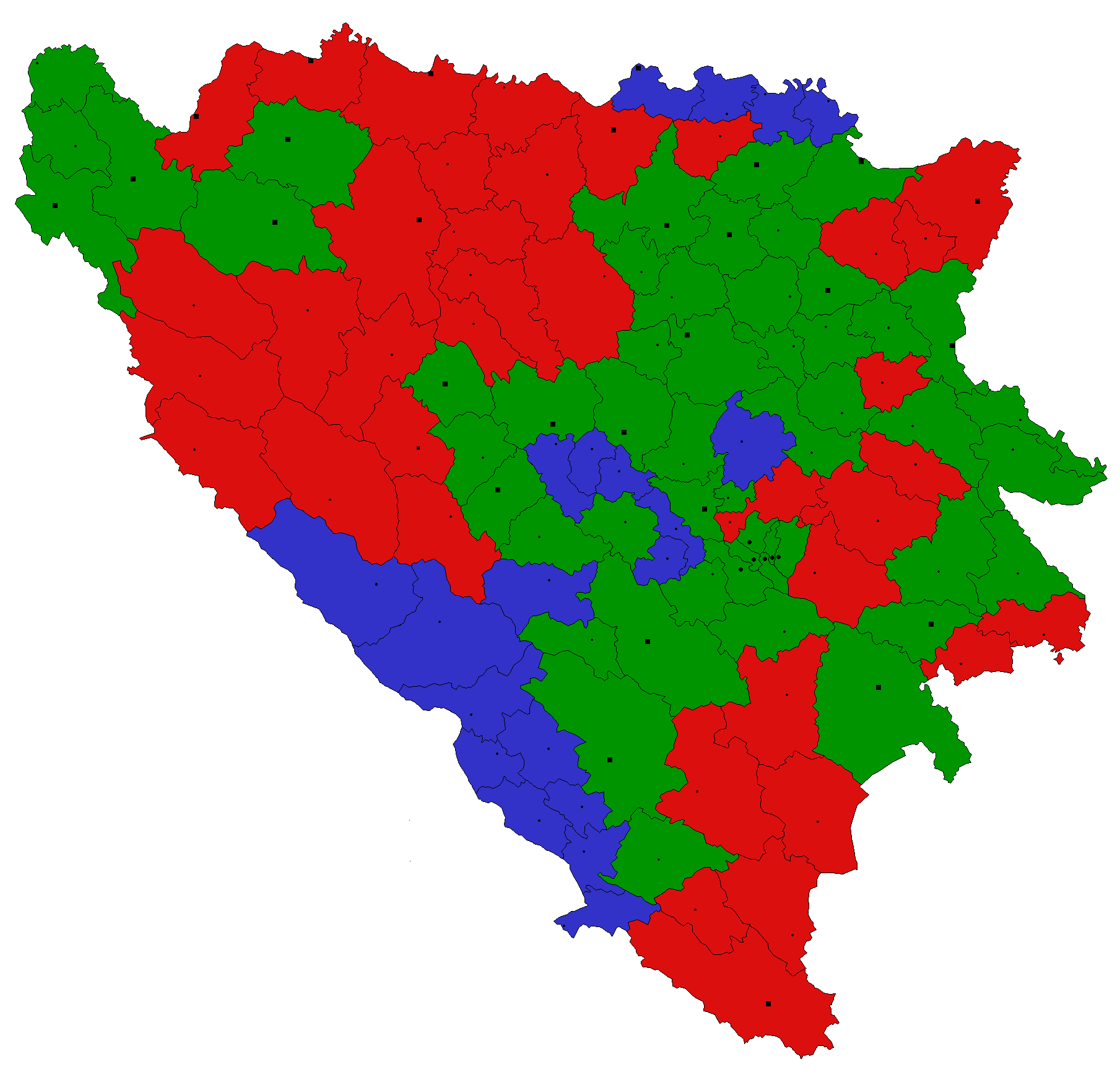
The 1992 Carrington–Cutileiro plan: Serbian cantons shown in red, Bosniak cantons in green, Croat cantons in blue; Bosniak and Serb cantons would have each covered 44% of the country's territory, with the Croat canton covering the remaining 12%

During the referendum on 1 March, Sarajevo was quiet except for a Serbian wedding being fired upon. The brandishing of Serbian flags in the Baščaršija was seen by Muslims as a deliberate provocation on the day of the referendum. Nikola Gardović, the bridegroom's father, was killed, and a Serbian Orthodox priest was wounded. Witnesses identified the killer as Ramiz Delalić, a gangster who had become a brazen criminal since the fall of communism and was stated to have been a member of the Bosniak paramilitary group the “Green Berets”. Arrest warrants were issued against him and another suspected assailant. SDS denounced the killing and claimed the failure to arrest him was due to SDA or Bosnian government complicity. Speaking for the SDS, Rajko Dukić said that the shooting was evidence that Sarajevo Serbs were in mortal danger and would be more so in an independent Bosnia, which was rejected by Sefer Halilović, founder of the Patriotic League, an early pro-government defence organization, who stated it “wasn't really a wedding” but a provocation and accused the wedding guests of being SDS activists.

Barricades appeared the following morning at key transit points across the city which were manned by armed and masked SDS supporters. SDS officials Dukić and Velibor Ostojić justified the barricades as a reaction both to the Baščaršija shooting and the “illegal referendum”, the result of which, they said, SDS would not accept. The barricades were dismantled on the evening of 2 March following negotiations between Izetbegović and Karadžić brokered by the JNA.

On 18 March 1992, at a fifth round of negotiations chaired by Cutileiro, all three sides agreed to a version of the “Statement of Principles”, now known as the Carrington–Cutileiro plan: Alija Izetbegović for the SDA, Radovan Karadžić for the SDS and Mate Boban for the HDZ. The agreement concerned the constitutional arrangements of the new state and included a provisional map of the constituent units to be assigned to and modified by a working group. While SDA and HDZ appeared to have renounced their agreement to the plan in the following week, all sides recommitted to it at a further round of negotiations on 30 and 31 March 1992 in Brussels.

For many years it was reported that Izetbegović had withdrawn his agreement to the plan on 28 March 1992, and declared his opposition to any type of ethnic division of Bosnia after meeting with the US ambassador to Yugoslavia Warren Zimmermann in Sarajevo, at which Zimmermann supposedly encouraged Izetbegović to repudiate the agreement reached on 18 March. However, in a July 2026 paper, Alex Cruikshanks argued that, almost certainly, no such meeting could have taken place and that the terms of the 18 March agreement had already been rejected three days before the date of the supposed meeting.

In late March 1992, there was fighting between the ethnic groups. Yugoslavian submissions in the Bosnian genocide case before the ICJ identify “three hotbeds of crisis: Bosanski Brod, Neum and Goražde” of fighting between Bosniak and Croat forces on the one side and JNA units on the other; fighting in and around Bosanski Brod resulted in the killing of Serb civilians in Sijekovac on 26 March 1992. On 1–2 April 1992, Serb paramilitaries committed the Bijeljina massacre, most of the victims of which were Bosniaks.

An additional round of negotiations between SDA, SDS, and HDZ scheduled for 10–12 April 1992 in Sarajevo focused entirely on ceasefire negotiations rather than the original plan due to the changed circumstances.

== Factions ==
There were three factions in the Bosnian War:

- Bosnian (mainly ethnically Bosniak), loyal to the Republic of Bosnia and Herzegovina
- Croat, loyal to the Croatian Republic of Herzeg-Bosnia and Croatia
- Serb/Yugoslav, loyal to the Republika Srpska and Federal Republic of Yugoslavia

The three ethnic groups predominantly supported their respective ethnic or national faction: Bosniaks mainly the ARBiH, Croats the HVO, Serbs the VRS. There were foreign volunteers in each faction.

=== Bosnian ===
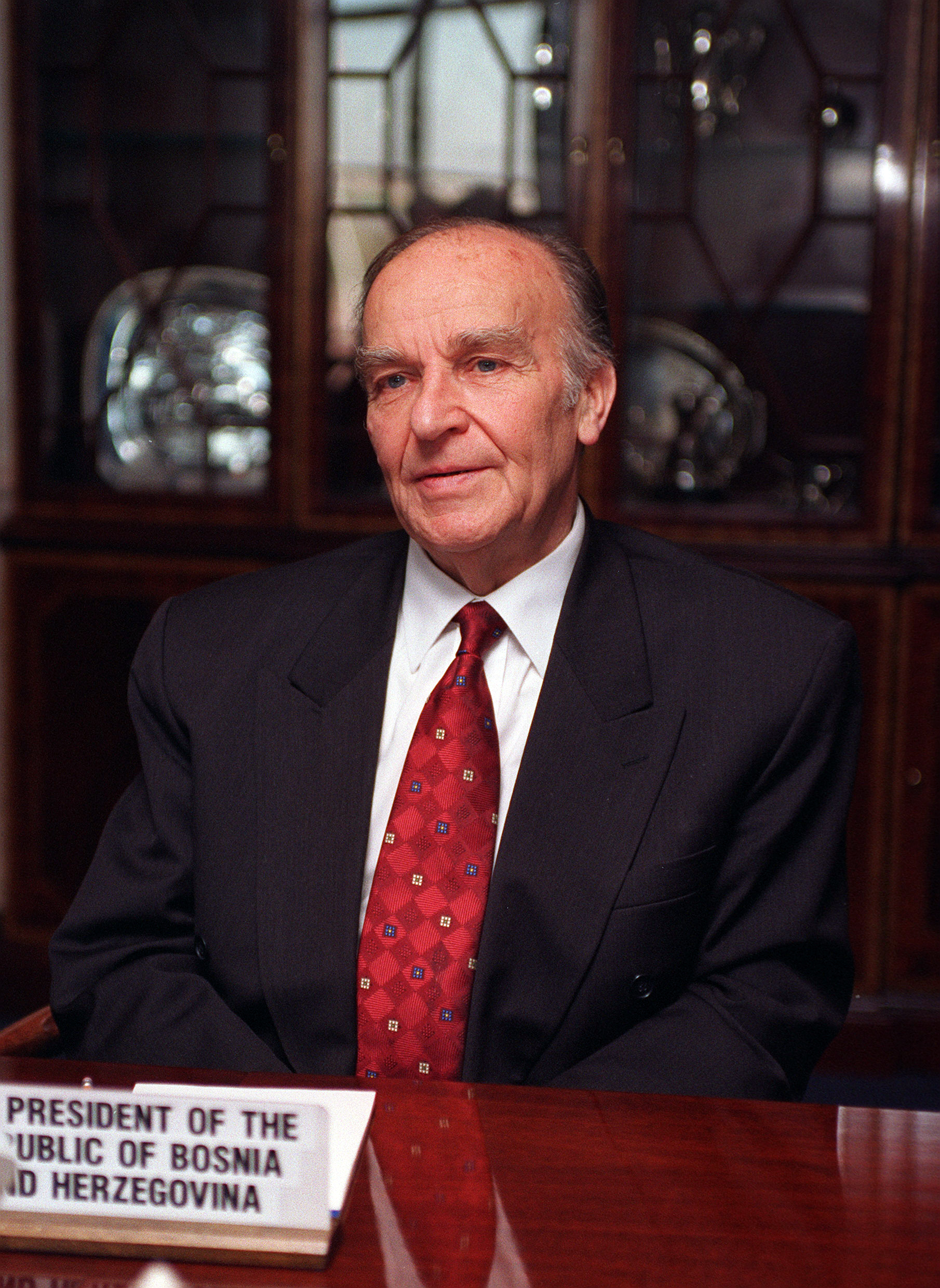
Alija Izetbegović during his visit to the United States in 1997

The Bosnians mainly organised into the Army of the Republic of Bosnia and Herzegovina (Armija Republike Bosne i Hercegovine, ARBiH) as the armed forces of the Republic of Bosnia and Herzegovina. Forces of the Republic of Bosnia and Herzegovina were divided into five Corps. 1st Corps operated in the region of Sarajevo and Goražde, while the stronger 5th Corps was positioned in the western Bosanska Krajina pocket, which cooperated with HVO units in and around Bihać. The Bosnian government forces were poorly equipped and unprepared for war.

Sefer Halilović, Chief of Staff of the Bosnian Territorial Defense, claimed in June 1992 that his forces were 70% Muslim, 18% Croat and 12% Serb. The percentage of Serb and Croat soldiers in the Bosnian Army was particularly high in Sarajevo, Mostar and Tuzla. The deputy commander of the Bosnian Army's Headquarters, was general Jovan Divjak, the highest-ranking ethnic Serb in the Bosnian Army. General Stjepan Šiber, an ethnic Croat was the second deputy commander. Izetbegović also appointed colonel Blaž Kraljević, commander of the Croatian Defence Forces in Herzegovina, to be a member of Bosnian Army's Headquarters, seven days before Kraljević's assassination, in order to assemble a multi-ethnic pro-Bosnian defense front. This diversity was to reduce over the course of the war.

The Bosnian government lobbied to have the arms embargo lifted, but that was opposed by the United Kingdom, France and Russia. U.S. proposals to pursue this policy were known as lift and strike. The U.S. Congress passed two resolutions calling for the embargo to be lifted, but both were vetoed by President Bill Clinton for fear of creating a rift between the US and the aforementioned countries. Nonetheless, the United States used both "black" C-130 transport planes and back channels, including Islamist groups, to smuggle weapons to Bosnian-Muslim forces, as well as allowed Iranian-supplied arms to transit through Croatia to Bosnia. However, in light of widespread NATO opposition to American (and possibly Turkish) endeavors in coordinating the "black flights of Tuzla", the United Kingdom and Norway expressed disapproval of these measures and their counterproductive effects on NATO enforcement of the arms embargo.

During 1992–1995, Pakistan's Inter-Services Intelligence secretly supplied the Muslim fighters with arms, ammunition and guided anti-tank missiles to give them a chance against the Serbs. Pakistan was thus defying the UN arms embargo. General Javed Nasir later claimed that the ISI had airlifted anti-tank guided missiles to Bosnia, which ultimately turned the tide in favour of Bosnian Muslims and forced the Serbs to lift the siege.

In his book The Clinton Tapes: Wrestling History with the President from 2009, historian and author Taylor Branch, a friend of U.S. President Bill Clinton, made public more than 70 recorded sessions with the president during his presidency from 1993 through 2001. According to a session taped on 14 October 1993, it is stated that:

Clinton said U.S. allies in Europe blocked proposals to adjust or remove the embargo. They justified their opposition on plausible humanitarian grounds, arguing that more arms would only fuel the bloodshed, but privately, said the president, key allies objected that an independent Bosnia would be "unnatural" as the only Muslim nation in Europe. He said they favored the embargo precisely because it locked in Bosnia's disadvantage. [..] When I expressed shock at such cynicism, reminiscent of the blind-eye diplomacy regarding the plight of Europe's Jews during World War II, President Clinton only shrugged. He said President François Mitterrand of France had been especially blunt in saying that Bosnia did not belong, and that British officials also spoke of a painful but realistic restoration of Christian Europe. Against Britain and France, he said, German chancellor Helmut Kohl among others had supported moves to reconsider the United Nations arms embargo, failing in part because Germany did not hold a seat on the U.N. Security Council.

— Taylor Branch, The Clinton Tapes: Wrestling History with the President

=== Croat ===
The Croats started organizing their military forces in late 1991. On 8 April 1992, the Croatian Defence Council (Hrvatsko vijeće obrane, HVO) was founded as the "supreme body of Croatian defence in Herzeg-Bosnia". The HVO was organised in four Operative Zones with headquarters in Mostar, Tomislavgrad, Vitez and Orašje. In February 1993, the HVO Main Staff estimated the strength of the HVO at 34,080 officers and men. Its armaments included around 50 main battle tanks, mainly T-34 and T-55, and 500 various artillery weapons.

At the beginning of the war, the Croatian government helped arm both the Croat and Bosniak forces. Logistics centres were established in Zagreb and Rijeka for the recruitment of soldiers for the ARBiH. The Croatian National Guard (Zbor Narodne Garde, ZNG), later renamed officially to Croatian Army (Hrvatska vojska, HV) was engaged in Bosnian Posavina, Herzegovina and Western Bosnia against the Serb forces. During the Croat-Bosniak conflict, the Croatian government provided arms for the HVO and organised the sending of units of volunteers, with origins from Bosnia and Herzegovina, to the HVO.

The Croatian Defence Forces (HOS), the paramilitary wing of the Croatian Party of Rights, fought against the Serb forces together with the HVO and ARBiH. The HOS was disbanded shortly after the death of their commander Blaž Kraljević and incorporated into the HVO and ARBiH.

=== Serb ===
The Army of Republika Srpska (Vojska Republike Srpske, VRS) was established on 12 May 1992. It was loyal to Republika Srpska, the Serbian-populated portion of Bosnia which did not wish to break away from Yugoslavia. Bosnian Serb political leader Radovan Karadžić stated "Our optimum is a Greater Serbia, and if not that, then a Federal Yugoslavia".

Throughout the war, the VRS was involved in numerous military operations, many of which were marked by severe human rights violations. The most infamous of these was the Srebrenica massacre in July 1995, where more than 8,000 Bosniak men and boys were killed. This event has been classified as genocide by international courts and is emblematic of the VRS's broader campaign against Bosniak civilians, which included systematic ethnic cleansing, forced displacement, and other war crimes.

Serbia provided logistical support, money and supplies to the VRS. Bosnian Serbs had made up a substantial part of the JNA officer corps. Milošević relied on the Bosnian Serbs to win the war themselves, but most of the command chain, weaponry, and higher-ranked military personnel, including General Ratko Mladić, were from the JNA.

=== Paramilitary and volunteers ===
Various paramilitary units operated during the Bosnian War: the Serb "White Eagles" (Beli Orlovi) and "Serbian Volunteer Guard" (Srpska Dobrovoljačka Garda), also known as "Arkan's Tigers"; the Bosnian "Patriotic League" (Patriotska Liga) and "Green Berets" (Zelene Beretke); and Croat "Croatian Defence Forces" (Hrvatske Obrambene Snage), etc. The Serb and Croat paramilitaries involved volunteers from Serbia and Croatia, and were supported by nationalist political parties in those countries.

The war attracted foreign fighters and mercenaries from various countries. Volunteers came to fight for a variety of reasons, including religious or ethnic loyalties and in some cases for money. As a general rule, Bosniaks received support from Islamic countries, Serbs from Eastern Orthodox countries, and Croats from Catholic countries. The presence of foreign fighters is well documented, however none of these groups comprised more than 5 percent of any of the respective armies' total manpower strength.

The Bosnian Serbs received support from Christian Slavic fighters from various countries in Eastern Europe, including volunteers from other Orthodox Christian countries. These included hundreds of Russians, around 100 Greeks, and some Ukrainians and Romanians. Some estimate as many as 1,000 such volunteers. Greek volunteers of the Greek Volunteer Guard were reported to have taken part in the Srebrenica Massacre, with the Greek flag being hoisted in Srebrenica when the town fell to the Serbs.

Some individuals from other European countries volunteered to fight for the Croat side, including Neo-Nazis such as Jackie Arklöv, who was charged with war crimes upon his return to Sweden. Later he confessed he committed war crimes on Bosnian Muslim civilians in the Heliodrom and Dretelj camps as a member of Croatian forces.

The Bosnians received support from Muslim groups. Pakistan supported Bosnia while providing technical and military support. Pakistan's Inter-Services Intelligence (ISI) allegedly ran an active military intelligence program during the Bosnian War which started in 1992 lasting until 1995. Executed and supervised by Pakistani General Javed Nasir, the program provided logistics and ammunition supplies to various groups of Bosnian mujahideen during the war. The ISI Bosnian contingent was organised with financial assistance provided by Saudi Arabia, according to the British historian Mark Curtis.

According to The Washington Post, Saudi Arabia provided $300 million in weapons to government forces in Bosnia with the knowledge and tacit cooperation of the United States, a claim denied by US officials. Foreign Muslim fighters also joined the ranks of the Bosnian Muslims, including from the Lebanese guerrilla organisation Hezbollah, and the global organization al-Qaeda.

== Prelude ==
From July 1991 to January 1992, during the Croatian War of Independence, the JNA and Serb paramilitaries used Bosnian territory to mount attacks on Croatia. The JNA armed Bosnian Serbs, and the Croatian Defence Force armed Herzegovinian Croats during the war in Croatia. The Bosnian Muslim Green Berets were already established in the autumn of 1991, and drew up a defense plan in February 1992. It was estimated that 250–300,000 Bosnians were armed, and that some 10,000 were fighting in Croatia. By March 1992, perhaps three-quarters of the country were claimed by Serb and Croat nationalists. On 4 April 1992, Izetbegović ordered all reservists and police in Sarajevo to mobilise, and SDS called for evacuation of the city's Serbs, marking the "definite rupture between the Bosnian government and Serbs". Bosnia and Herzegovina received international recognition on 6 April 1992. The most common view is that the war started that day.

== Course of the war ==
=== 1992 ===
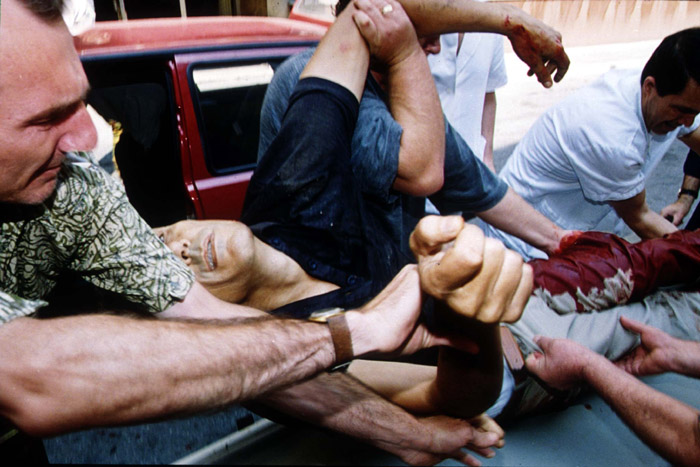
A victim of a mortar attack delivered to a Sarajevo hospital in 1992

The war in Bosnia escalated in April. On 3 April, the Battle of Kupres began between the JNA and a combined HV-HVO force that ended in a JNA victory. On 6 April, Serb forces began shelling Sarajevo, and in the next two days crossed the Drina from Serbia proper and besieged Bosniak-majority Zvornik, Višegrad and Foča. After the capture of Zvornik, Bosnian Serb troops killed several hundred Bosniaks and forced tens of thousands to flee. All of Bosnia was engulfed in war by mid-April. On 23 April, the JNA evacuated its personnel by helicopter from the barracks in Čapljina, which had been blockaded since 4 March. There were efforts to halt violence. On 27 April, the Bosnian government ordered the JNA to be put under civilian control or expelled, which was followed by conflicts in early May between the two. Prijedor was taken over by Serbs on 30 April. On 2 May, the Green Berets and local gang members fought back a disorganised Serb attack aimed at cutting Sarajevo in two. On 3 May, Izetbegović was kidnapped at the Sarajevo airport by JNA officers, and used to gain safe passage of JNA troops from downtown Sarajevo. However, Bosnian forces attacked the departing JNA convoy, which embittered all sides. A ceasefire and agreement on evacuation of the JNA was signed on 18 May, and on 20 May the Bosnian presidency declared the JNA an occupation force.

The Army of Republika Srpska was newly established and put under the command of General Ratko Mladić, in a new phase of the war. Shellings on Sarajevo on 24, 26, 28 and 29 May were attributed to Mladić by UN Secretary-General Boutros Boutros-Ghali. Civilian casualties of a 27 May shelling led to Western intervention, in the form of sanctions imposed on 30 May through United Nations Security Council Resolution 757. Bosnian forces attacked JNA barracks in the city, which was followed by heavy shelling. On 5 and 6 June the last JNA personnel left the city during street fighting and shelling. The 20 June ceasefire, executed in order for UN takeover of the Sarajevo airport for humanitarian flights, was broken as both sides battled for the territory between the city and airport. The airport crisis led to Boutros-Ghali's ultimatum on 26 June, that the Serbs stop attacks on the city, allow the UN to take the airport, and place their heavy weapons under UN supervision. Meanwhile, media reported that Bush considered the use of force in Bosnia. World public opinion was "decisively and permanently against the Serbs" following media reports on the sniping and shelling of Sarajevo.

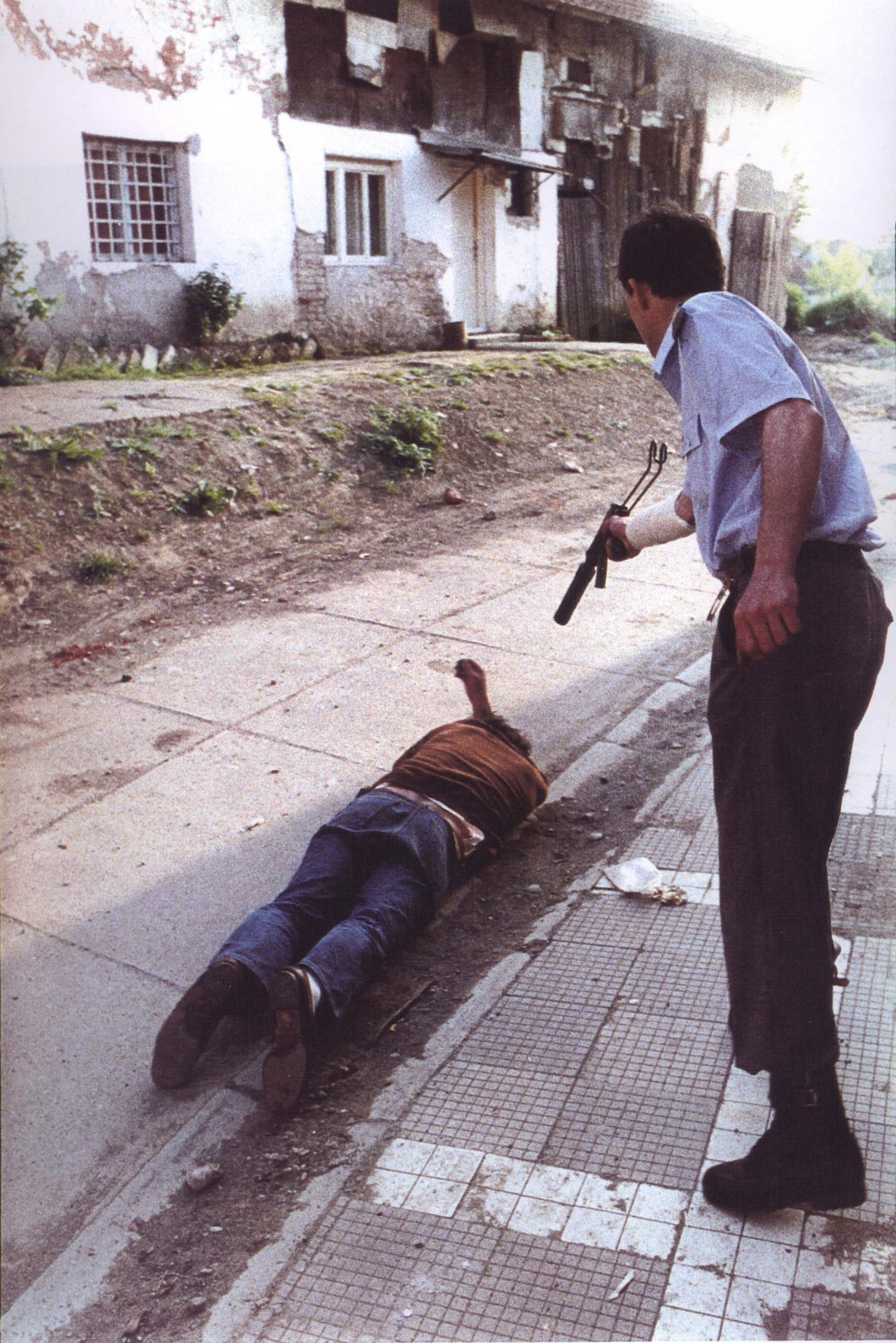
Goran Jelisić shooting a Bosniak man in Brčko in 1992

Outside of Sarajevo, the combatants' successes varied greatly in 1992. Serbs had seized Bosniak-majority cities along the Drina and Sava rivers and expelled their Muslim population within months. A joint Bosnian–HVO offensive in May, having taken advantage of the confusion following JNA withdrawal, reversed Serb advances into Posavina and central Bosnia. The offensive continued southwards, besieging Doboj, thereby cutting off Serb forces in Bosanska Krajina from Semberija and Serbia. In mid-May, Srebrenica was retaken by Bosnian forces under Naser Orić. Serb forces suffered a costly defeat in eastern Bosnia in May, when according to Serbian accounts Avdo Palić's force was ambushed near Srebrenica, killing 400. From May to August, Goražde was besieged by the VRS, until the siege was broken by the ARBiH on 1 September. In April 1992, the Croatian Defence Council (HVO) entered Orašje and, according to Croatian sources, began a campaign of harassment against Serb civilians, including torture, rape and murder.

On 15 May 1992, a JNA column was ambushed in Tuzla. The 92nd Motorised JNA Brigade received orders to leave Tuzla, in Bosnia and Herzegovina, and withdraw toward Serbia. An agreement was made with the Bosnian government that JNA units would be allowed until 19 May to leave Bosnia peacefully. Despite the agreement, the convoy was attacked in Tuzla's Brčanska Malta district with rifles and rocket launchers; mines were placed along its route. 52 JNA soldiers were killed and over 40 were wounded, most ethnic Serbs.

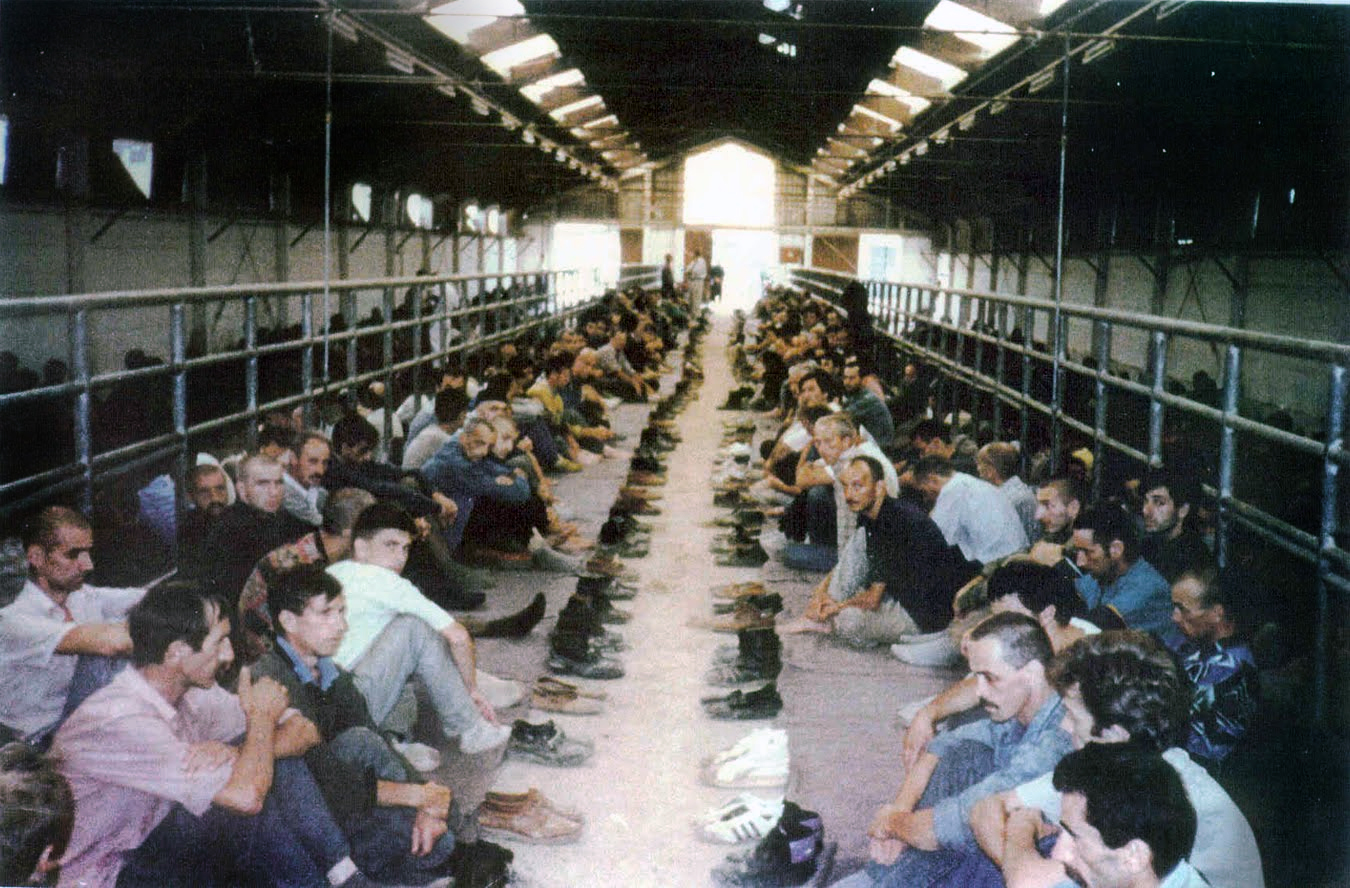
Bosniak civilian detainees mainly from the Prijedor region, in Manjača camp.

The Republic of Bosnia and Herzegovina was admitted as a member state of the UN on 22 May 1992. World public opinion was shaken by the existence of concentration camps established by the Yugoslav People's Army (JNA) and the authorities of Republika Srpska (RS), where thousands of Bosniak and Croat civilians were tortured, and killed. Following the occupation of the Prijedor region, Muslim civilians were captured and transported to camps such as Omarska, Trnopolje, Keraterm, Manjača, where they endured months of inhumane treatment and torture. A significant number were killed or disappeared, marking the gravest crime in the war until the Srebrenica genocide 3 years later. Other camps for non-Serbs were established throughout Bosnia in the campaign of ethnic cleansing, including Luka, Liplje, Batković, Sušica, Uzamnica, as well as camps for the rape of women in Foča and Višegrad. Bosniaks and Croats set up camps, with significantly fewer prisoners. The ICTY convicted about 20 individuals for crimes in these camps.

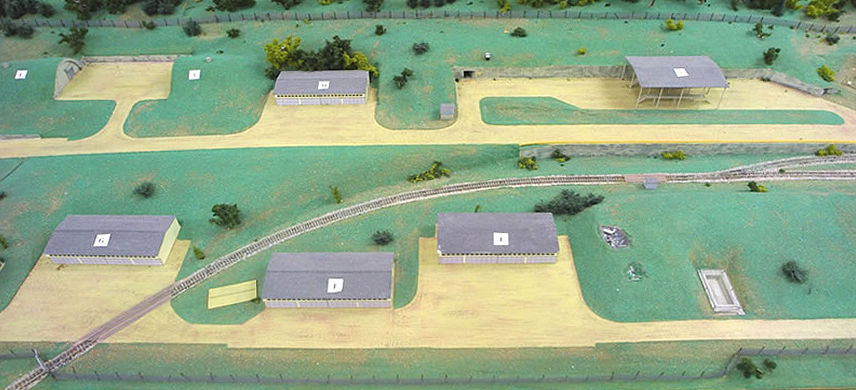
Model of the Čelebići camp, near Konjic, presented as evidence in the Mucić et al. trial

From May to December 1992, the Bosnian Ministry of the Interior (BiH MUP), HVO and later the Bosnian Territorial Defence Forces (TO RBiH) operated the Čelebići camp. It was used to detain Bosnian Serb prisoners of war, many were elderly, arrested during operations intended to de-block routes to Sarajevo and Mostar in May 1992 which had earlier been blocked by Serb forces. Of the 700 prisoners, at least 13 died while in captivity. Detainees were subjected to torture, sexual assaults, beatings and other cruel and inhuman treatment. Certain prisoners were shot, or beaten to death.

On 6 May 1992, Mate Boban met with Radovan Karadžić in Graz, Austria, where they reached an agreement for a ceasefire and discussed a demarcation between a Croat and Serb territorial unit, in Bosnia and Herzegovina. However, the ceasefire was broken the following day, when the JNA and Bosnian Serb forces mounted an attack on Croat-held positions in Mostar. In June 1992, Bosnian Serb forces attacked and pounded the Bosnian village of Žepa, which would lead to the 3-year long siege of Žepa.

By June 1992, refugees and internally displaced persons had reached 2.6 million. By September 1992, Croatia had accepted 335,985 refugees from Bosnia and Herzegovina, mostly Bosniak civilians (excluding men of military age). The number of refugees significantly strained the Croatian economy and infrastructure. Then-U.S. Ambassador to Croatia, Peter Galbraith, put the number of refugees in Croatia into a proper perspective in an interview on 8 November 1993. He said the situation would be the equivalent of the US taking in 30,000,000 refugees. The number of Bosnian refugees in Croatia, was surpassed only by the number of the internally displaced persons within Bosnia and Herzegovina itself, at 588,000. Serbia took in 252,130 refugees from Bosnia, while other former Yugoslav republics received a total of 148,657 people.

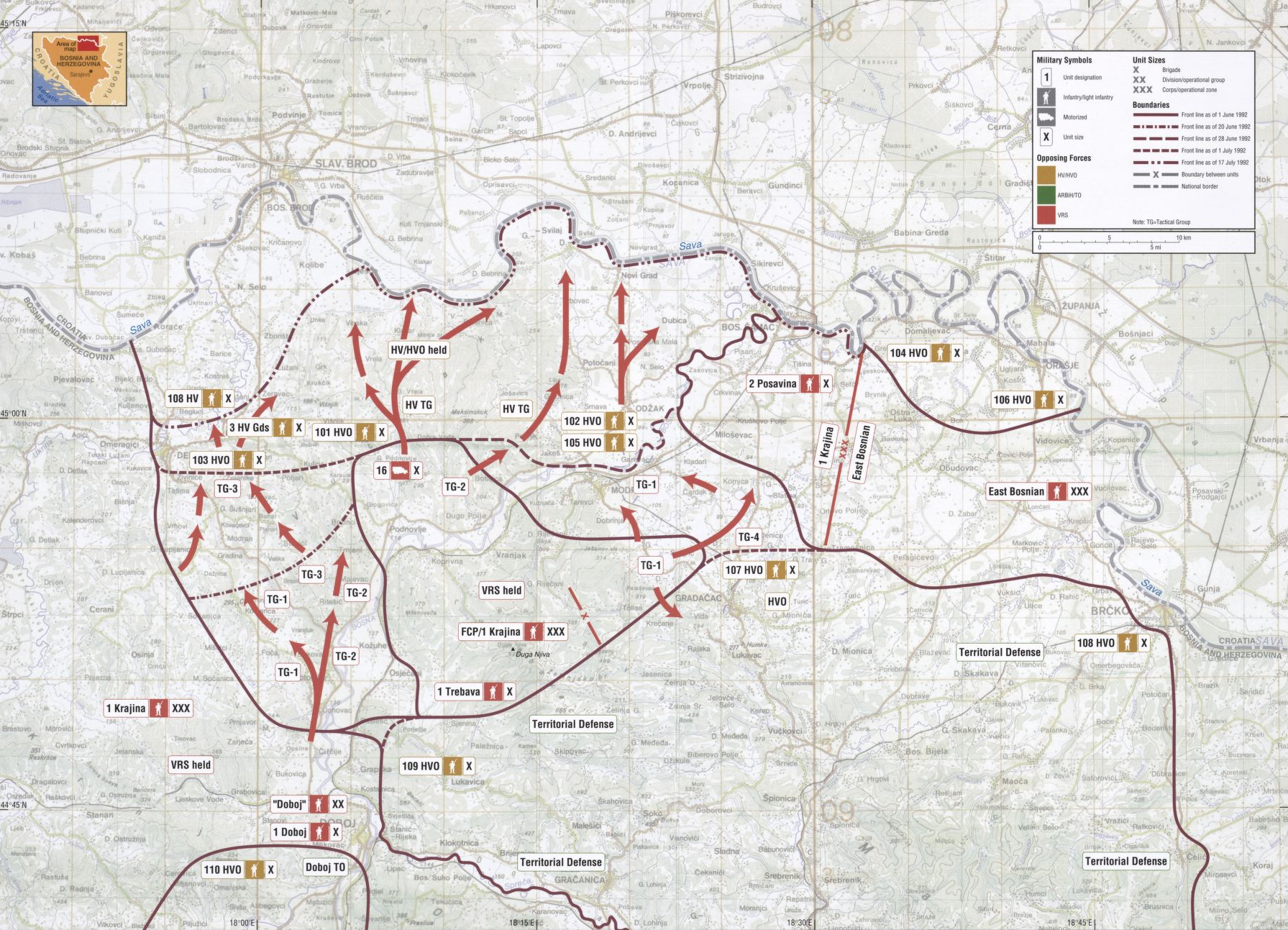
Map of Operation Corridor 92, fought between the VRS and the HV-HVO

In June 1992, the Bosnian Serbs started Operation Corridor in northern Bosnia against HV–HVO forces, to secure an open road between Belgrade, Banja Luka, and Knin. The reported deaths of 12 newborn babies in Banja Luka hospital due to a shortage of bottled oxygen for incubators was cited as an immediate cause for the action, but the veracity of these deaths has been questioned. Borisav Jović, a contemporary high-ranking Serbian official and member of the Yugoslav Presidency, has claimed the report was propaganda, stating that Banja Luka had 2 bottled oxygen production plants in its immediate vicinity and was self-reliant in that respect. Operation Corridor began on 14 June 1992, when the 16th Krajina Motorised Brigade of the VRS, aided by a VRS tank company from Doboj, began the offensive near Derventa. The VRS captured Modriča on 28 June, Derventa on 4–5 July, and Odžak on 12 July. The HV–HVO forces were reduced to isolated positions around Bosanski Brod and Orašje, which held out during August and September. The VRS managed to break through their lines in early October and capture Bosanski Brod. Most remaining Croat forces withdrew north to Croatia. The HV–HVO continued to hold the Orašje enclave and were able to repel an VRS attack in November. On 21 June 1992, Bosniak forces entered the Bosnian Serb village of Ratkovići near Srebrenica and murdered 24 Serb civilians.

In June 1992, the UNPROFOR, originally deployed in Croatia, had its mandate extended into Bosnia and Herzegovina, initially to protect the Sarajevo International Airport. In September, the role of UNPROFOR was expanded to protect humanitarian aid and assist relief delivery in the whole of Bosnia and Herzegovina, as well as to help protect civilian refugees when required by the Red Cross.

On 12 August 1992, the name of the Serbian Republic of Bosnia and Herzegovina was changed to Republika Srpska (RS). By November 1992, 1,000 square kilometres (400 sq mi) of eastern Bosnia was under Muslim control.

==== Croat–Bosniak relations in late 1992 ====
The Croat–Bosniak alliance, formed at the beginning of the war, was often not harmonious. The existence of two parallel commands caused problems in coordinating the two armies against the VRS. An attempt to create a joint HVO and TO military headquarters in mid-April failed. On 21 July 1992, the Agreement on Friendship and Cooperation was signed by Tuđman and Izetbegović, establishing a military cooperation between the two armies. At a session held on 6 August, the Bosnian Presidency accepted HVO as an integral part of the Bosnian armed forces.

Despite these attempts, tensions steadily increased throughout the second half of 1992. An armed conflict occurred in Busovača in early May and another one on 13 June. On 19 June, a conflict between the units of the TO on one side, and HVO and HOS units on the other side broke out in Novi Travnik. Incidents were also recorded in Konjic in July, and in Kiseljak and the Croat settlement of Stup in Sarajevo during August. On 14 September, the Constitutional Court of Bosnia and Herzegovina declared the proclamation of Herzeg-Bosnia unconstitutional.

On 18 October, a dispute over a petrol station near Novi Travnik that was shared by both armies escalated into armed conflict in the town centre. The situation worsened after HVO Commander Ivica Stojak was killed near Travnik on 20 October. On the same day, fighting escalated on an ARBiH roadblock set on the main road through the Lašva Valley. Spontaneous clashes spread throughout the region and resulted in almost 50 casualties until a ceasefire was negotiated by the UNPROFOR on 21 October. On 23 October, a major battle between the ARBiH and the HVO started in the town of Prozor in northern Herzegovina and resulted in an HVO victory.

On 29 October, the VRS captured Jajce. The town was defended by both the HVO and the ARBiH, but the lack of cooperation, as well as an advantage in troop size and firepower for the VRS, led to the fall of the town. Croat refugees from Jajce fled to Herzegovina and Croatia, while around 20,000 Bosniak refugees settled in Travnik, Novi Travnik, Vitez, Busovača, and villages near Zenica. Despite the October confrontations, and with each side blaming the other for the fall of Jajce, there were no large-scale clashes and a general military alliance was still in effect. Tuđman and Izetbegović met in Zagreb on 1 November 1992 and agreed to establish a Joint Command of HVO and ARBiH.

=== 1993 ===
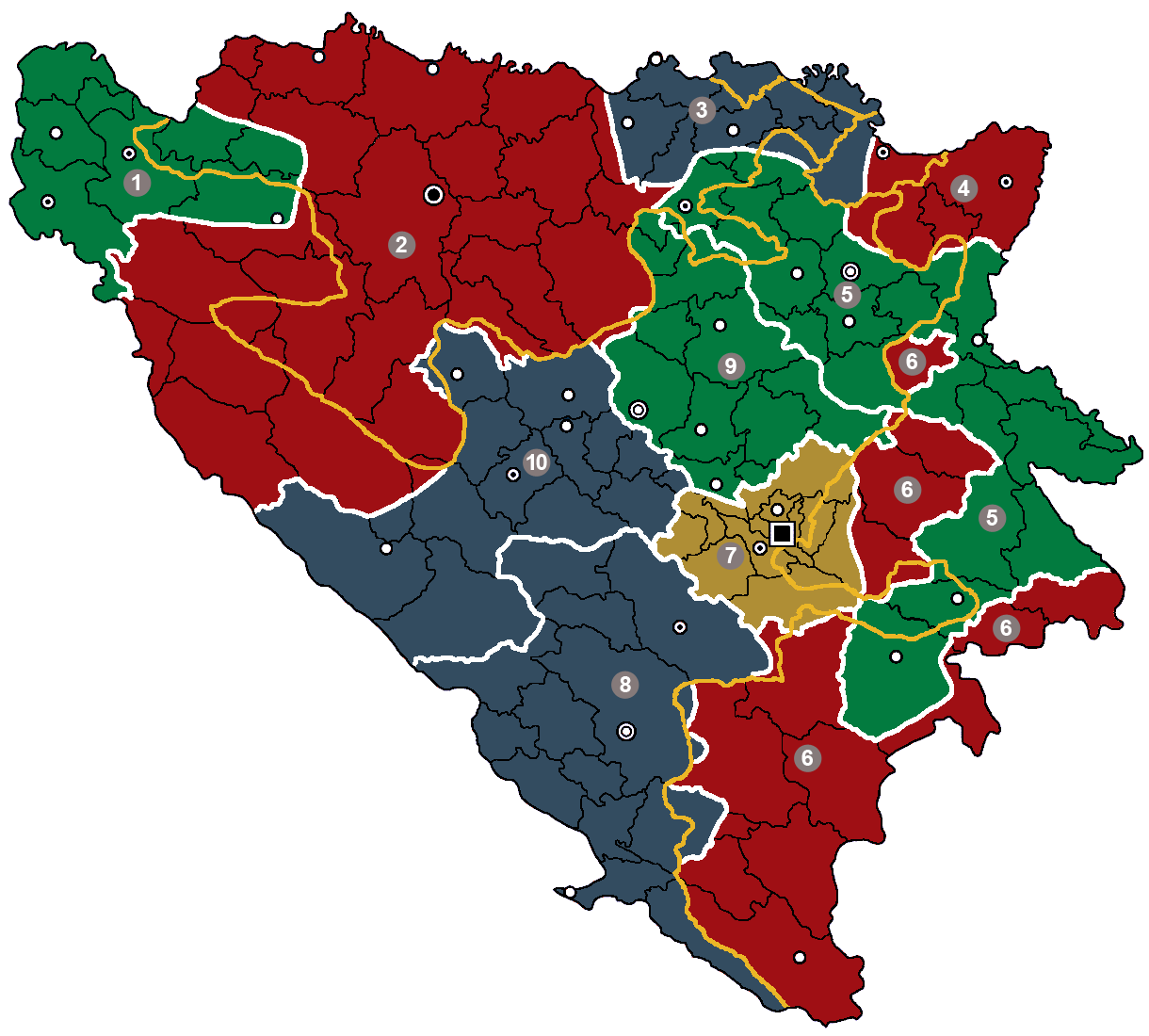
First version of the Vance-Owen plan, which would have established 10 provinces Bosniak province Croat province Serb province Sarajevo district Present-day administrative borders

On 7 January 1993, Orthodox Christmas Day, 8th Operational Unit Srebrenica, a unit of the ARBiH under the command of Naser Orić, attacked the village of Kravica near Bratunac. 46 Serbs died in the attack: 35 soldiers and 11 civilians. 119 Serb civilians and 424 Serb soldiers died in Bratunac during the war. Republika Srpska claimed that the ARBiH forces torched Serb homes and massacred civilians. However, this could not be verified during the ICTY trials, which concluded that many homes were already destroyed and that the siege of Srebrenica caused hunger, forcing Bosniaks to attack nearby Serb villages to acquire food to survive. In 2006, Orić was found guilty by the ICTY on the charges of not preventing murder of Serbs, but was acquitted of all charges on appeal.

On 8 January 1993, Serb forces killed the deputy prime minister of the RBiH Hakija Turajlić after stopping the UN convoy transporting him from the airport. On 16 January 1993, soldiers of the ARBiH attacked the Bosnian Serb village of Skelani, near Srebrenica. 69 people were killed, 185 were wounded. Among the victims were 6 children.

Peace plans were proposed by the UN, US and European Community (EC), but they had little impact on the war. These included the Vance-Owen Peace Plan, revealed in January 1993. The plan was presented by UN Special Envoy Cyrus Vance and EC representative David Owen. It envisioned Bosnia and Herzegovina as a decentralised state with ten autonomous provinces.

On 22 February 1993, the United Nations Security Council passed Resolution 808 "that an international tribunal shall be established for the prosecution of persons responsible for serious violations of international humanitarian law". On 15–16 May, the Vance-Owen peace plan was rejected in a referendum. The peace plan was viewed by some as one of the factors leading to the escalation of the Croat–Bosniak conflict in central Bosnia.

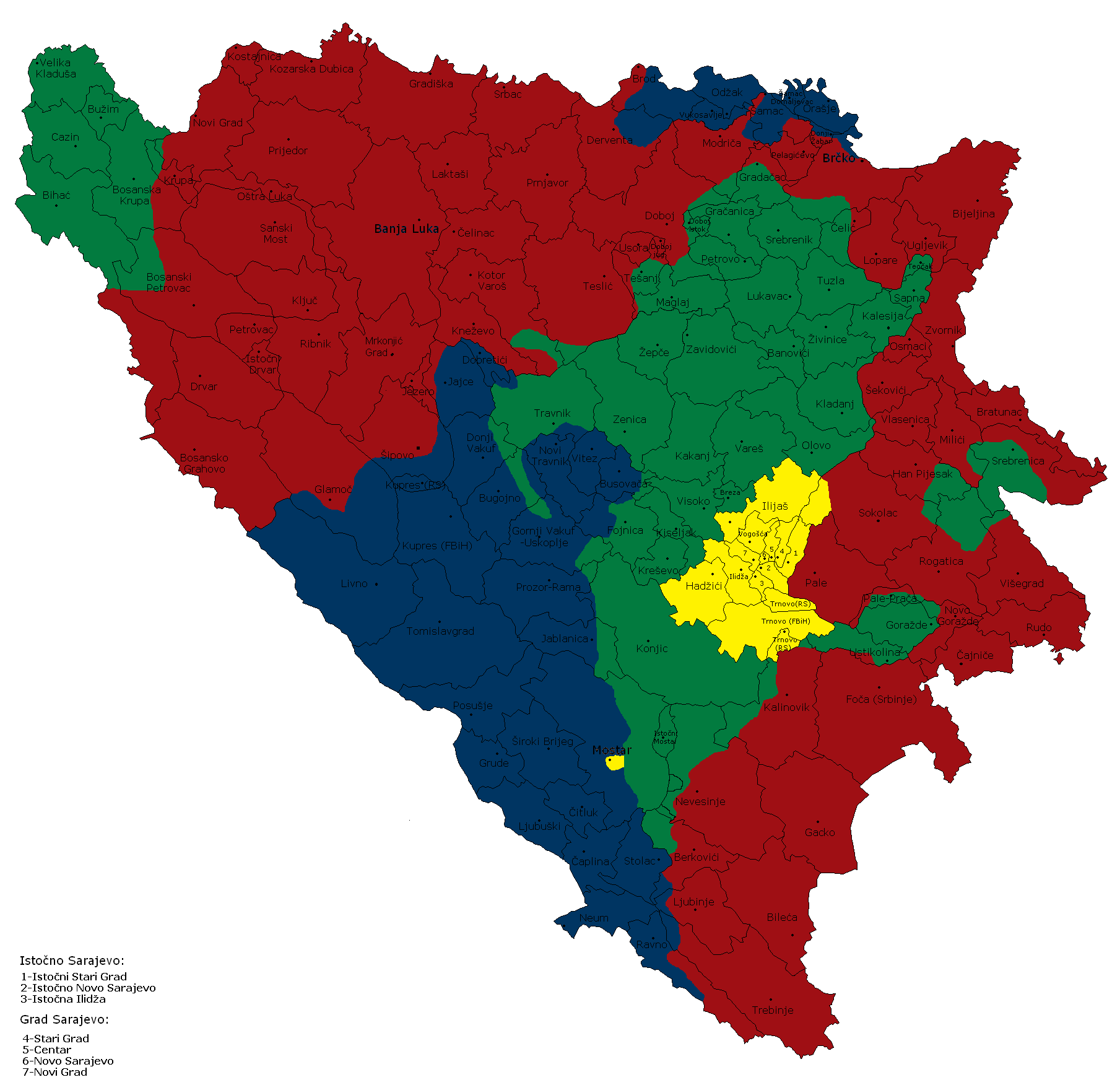
Owen–Stoltenberg plan

On 31 March 1993, the Security Council issued Resolution 816, calling on member states to enforce a no-fly zone over Bosnia-Herzegovina. On 12 April 1993, NATO commenced Operation Deny Flight to enforce this no-fly zone. On 25 May 1993 the International Criminal Tribunal for the former Yugoslavia (ICTY) was formally established by United Nations Security Council Resolution 827.

In late July, representatives of Bosnia's three warring factions entered into a new round of negotiations. On 20 August, UN mediators Thorvald Stoltenberg and David Owen, showed a map that would set the stage for Bosnia to be partitioned into 3 ethnic states. Bosnian-Serbs would be given 52% of Bosnia's territory, Muslims 30% and Bosnian-Croats 18%. Alija Izetbegović rejected the plan on 29 August.

==== Outbreak of the Croat–Bosniak War ====
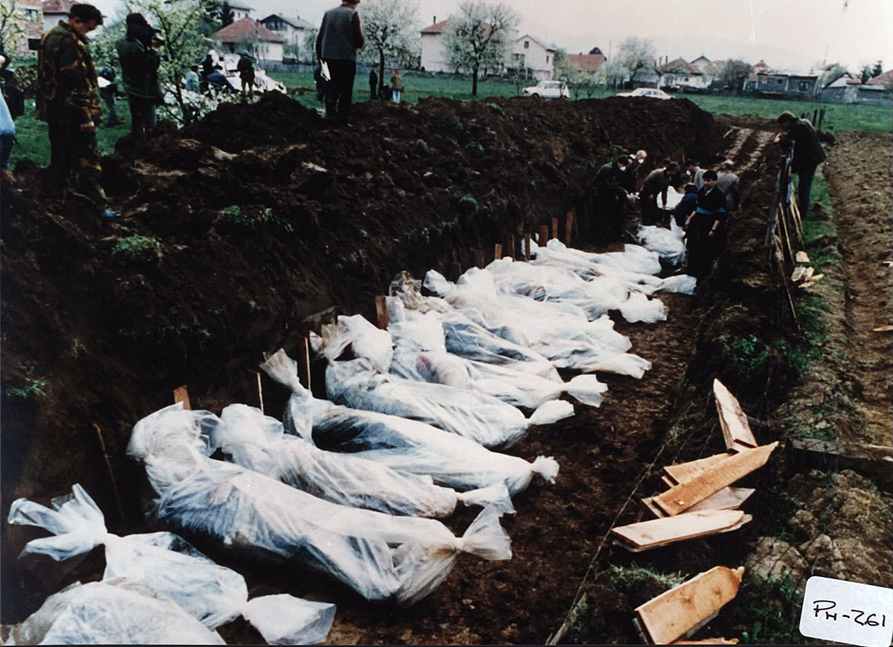
Bodies of people killed in April 1993 around Vitez.

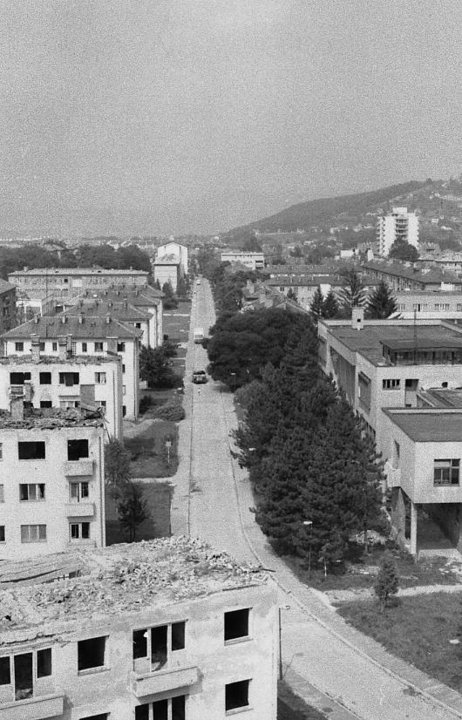
Novi Travnik in 1993, during the Croat–Bosniak War

Much of 1993 was dominated by the Croat–Bosniak War. In early January, the HVO and the ARBiH clashed in Gornji Vakuf in central Bosnia. A temporary ceasefire was reached after days of fighting, with UNPROFOR mediation. The war spread from Gornji Vakuf into Busovača in the second half of January. Busovača was the main intersection point of the lines of communication in the Lašva Valley. By 26 January, the ARBiH seized control of villages in the area, including Kaćuni and Bilalovac on the Busovača–Kiseljak road, thus isolating Kiseljak from Busovača. In the Kiseljak area, the ARBiH secured the villages northeast of the town of Kiseljak, but most of the municipality and the town itself remained in HVO control. On 26 January, six POWs and a Serb civilian were killed by the ARBiH in the village of Dusina, north of Busovača. The fighting in Busovača also led to Bosniak civilian casualties.

On 30 January, ARBiH and HVO leaders met in Vitez, together with representatives from UNPROFOR and other foreign observers, and signed a ceasefire in the area of central Bosnia, which came into effect the following day. The situation was still tense so Enver Hadžihasanović, commander of ARBiH's 3rd Corps, and Tihomir Blaškić, commander of HVO's Operative Zone Central Bosnia, had a meeting on 13 February where a joint ARBiH-HVO commission was formed to resolve incidents. The January ceasefire in central Bosnia held through to early April, despite minor incidents. The Croats attributed the escalation of the conflict to the increased Islamic policy of the Bosniaks, while Bosniaks accused the Croat side of separatism.

==== Central Bosnia ====
The beginning of April was marked by incidents in central Bosnia between Bosniak and Croat civilians and soldiers, including assaults, murders and armed confrontations. The most serious were the kidnapping of four members of the HVO outside Novi Travnik, and of HVO commander Živko Totić near Zenica by mujahideen. The ARBiH representatives denied any involvement and a joint ARBiH-HVO commission was formed to investigate. The HVO personnel were subsequently exchanged in May for POWs that were arrested by the HVO. The April incidents escalated into an armed conflict on 15 April in the area of Vitez, Busovača, Kiseljak and Zenica. The outnumbered HVO in the Zenica municipality was quickly defeated, followed by an exodus of Croat civilians.

In the Busovača municipality, the ARBiH gained some ground and inflicted heavy casualties on the HVO, but the HVO held the town of Busovača and the Kaonik intersection between Busovača and Vitez. The ARBiH failed to cut the HVO held Kiseljak enclave into smaller parts and isolate the town of Fojnica from Kiseljak. Many Bosniak civilians were detained or forced to leave Kiseljak.

In the Vitez area, Blaškić used his limited forces to carry out spoiling attacks on the ARBiH, thus preventing the ARBiH from cutting of the Travnik–Busovača road and seizing the SPS explosives factory in Vitez. On 16 April, the HVO launched a spoiling attack on Ahmići, east of Vitez. After the attacking units breached the ARBiH lines and entered the village, groups of irregular HVO units went from house to house, burning them and killing civilians. When Croat forces arrived in Ahmići, they left all Croats alone, and massacred the Bosniaks who could not flee in time. The Ahmići massacre resulted in more than 100 killed Bosniak civilians. The massacre was discovered by UN peacekeeping troops of the 1st Battalion, Cheshire Regiment, drawn from the British Army, under the command of Colonel Bob Stewart. The Bosnian Government made a monument dedicated to all 116 victims. Elsewhere in the area, the HVO blocked the ARBiH forces in the Stari Vitez quarter of Vitez and prevented an ARBiH advance south of the town. On 24 April, mujahideen attacked the Miletići northeast of Travnik and killed four Croat civilians. The rest of the captured civilians were taken to the Poljanice camp. However, the conflict did not spread to Travnik and Novi Travnik, though the HVO and the ARBiH brought in reinforcements from this area. On 25 April, Izetbegović and Boban signed a ceasefire. ARBiH Chief of Staff, Sefer Halilović, and HVO Chief of Staff, Milivoj Petković, met on a weekly basis to solve issues and implement the ceasefire. However, the truce was not respected on the ground and the HVO and ARBiH forces were still engaged in the Busovača area until 30 April.

==== Herzegovina ====
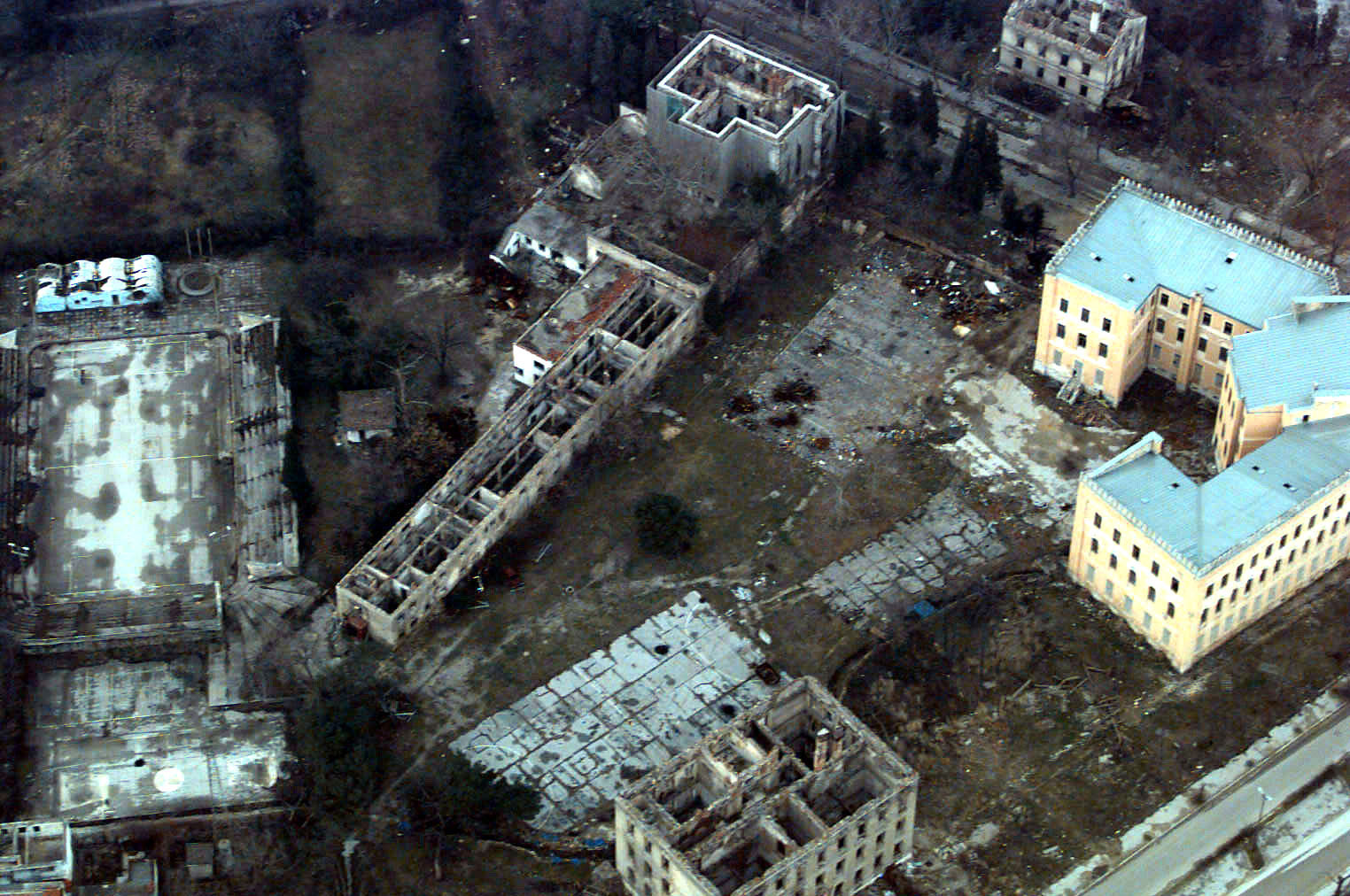
Aerial photo of destroyed buildings in Mostar

The Croat–Bosniak War spread from central Bosnia to northern Herzegovina on 14 April with an ARBiH attack on a HVO-held village outside of Konjic. The HVO responded, capturing 3 villages northeast of Jablanica. On 16 April, 15 Croat civilians and 7 POWs were killed by the ARBiH in the village of Trusina, north of Jablanica. The battles of Konjic and Jablanica lasted until May, with the ARBiH taking control of both towns and nearby villages.

By mid-April, Mostar had become a divided city with the majority-Croat western part dominated by the HVO, and the majority-Bosniak eastern part dominated by the ARBiH. The Battle of Mostar began on 9 May when both the east and west parts of the city came under artillery fire. Street battles followed, despite a ceasefire signed on 13 May by Milivoj Petković and Sefer Halilović, until 21 May. The HVO established prison camps in Dretelj near Čapljina and in Heliodrom, while the ARBiH formed prison camps in Potoci and in a school in eastern Mostar. The battle was renewed on 30 June. The ARBiH secured the northern approaches to Mostar and the east of the city, but their advance to the south was repelled by the HVO.

==== June–July Offensives ====
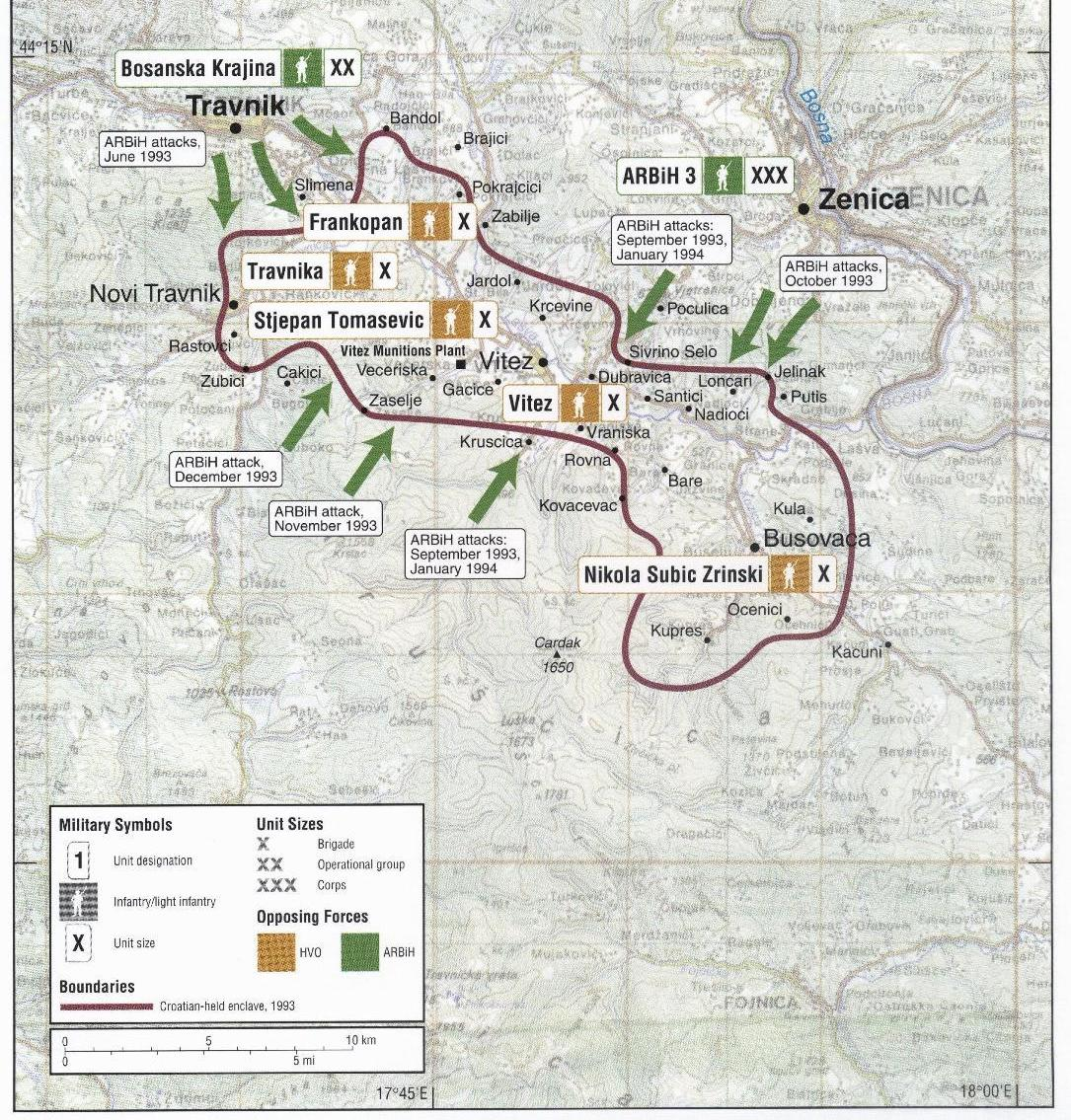
The front lines in the Lašva Valley in 1993 between the ARBiH and the HVO, including Novi Travnik, Vitez and Busovača

In the first week of June, the ARBiH launched an offensive in Travnik, attacking the HVO headquarters and units positioned on the front lines against the VRS. After three days of street fighting the outnumbered HVO forces were defeated, with thousands of Croat civilians and soldiers fleeing to nearby Serb-held territory as they were cut off from HVO-held positions. The ARBiH offensive continued east of Travnik to secure the road to Zenica, which was achieved by 14 June. On 8 June, 24 Croat civilians and POWs were killed by mujahideen near the village of Bikoši.

A similar development took place in Novi Travnik. On 9 June, the ARBiH attacked HVO units positioned east of the town, facing the VRS in Donji Vakuf, and the next day fighting followed in Novi Travnik. By 15 June, the ARBiH secured the area northwest of the town, while the HVO kept the northeast part of the municipality and the town of Novi Travnik. The battle continued into July with only minor changes on the front lines.

The HVO in the town of Kakanj was overran in mid June and around 13–15,000 Croat refugees fled to Kiseljak and Vareš. In the Kiseljak enclave, the HVO held off an attack on Kreševo, but lost Fojnica on 3 July. On 24 June, the Battle of Žepče began that ended with an ARBiH defeat on 30 June. In late July the ARBiH seized control of Bugojno, leading to the departure of 15,000 Croats. A prison camp was established in the football stadium, where around 800 Croats were sent.

At the beginning of September, the ARBiH launched an operation known as Operation Neretva '93 against the HVO in Herzegovina and central Bosnia, on a 200 km long front. It was one of their largest offensives in 1993. The ARBiH expanded its territory west of Jablanica and secured the road to eastern Mostar, while the HVO kept the area of Prozor and secured its forces rear in western Mostar. During the night of 8/9 September, at least 13 Croat civilians were killed by the ARBiH in the Grabovica massacre. 29 Croat civilians and one POW were killed in the Uzdol massacre on 14 September.

On 23 October, 37 Bosniaks were killed by the HVO in the Stupni Do massacre. This event served as the immediate pretext for an ARBiH offensive against the HVO-held Vareš enclave at the beginning of November. Croat civilians and soldiers abandoned Vareš on 3 November and fled to Kiseljak. The ARBiH entered Vareš on the following day, which was looted.

==== May–June 1993 UN Safe Areas extension ====
In an attempt to protect civilians, the role of UNPROFOR was extended in May 1993 to protect the "safe havens" the UN Security Council had declared around Sarajevo, Goražde, Srebrenica, Tuzla, Žepa and Bihać in Resolution 824 of 6 May 1993. On 4 June 1993 the UN Security Council passed Resolution 836 authorising use of force by UNPROFOR in the protection of the safe zones. On 15 June 1993, Operation Sharp Guard, a naval blockade in the Adriatic Sea by NATO and the Western European Union, began and continued until it was lifted in June 1996 on termination of the UN arms embargo.

The HVO and the ARBiH continued to fight side by side against the VRS in some areas of Bosnia and Herzegovina, including the Bihać pocket, Bosnian Posavina and the Tešanj area. Despite some animosity, an HVO brigade of around 1,500 soldiers fought along with the ARBiH in Sarajevo. In other areas where the alliance collapsed, the VRS occasionally cooperated with both the HVO and ARBiH, pursuing a local balancing policy and allying with the weaker side.

=== 1994 ===
The forced deportations of Bosniaks from Serb-held territories and the resulting refugee crisis continued to escalate. Thousands of people were being bused out of Bosnia each month, threatened on religious grounds. As a result, Croatia was strained by 500,000 refugees, and in mid-1994 the Croatian authorities forbade entry to a group of 462 refugees fleeing northern Bosnia, forcing UNPROFOR to improvise shelter for them. Between 30 March and 23 April 1994, the Serbs launched another major offensive against the town with the primary objective of overrunning Goražde. On 9 April 1994, the Secretary General of the UN, citing Security Resolution 836, threatened airstrikes on the Serbian forces which were attacking the Goražde enclave. For the next two days, NATO planes carried out air strikes against Serb tanks and outposts. However, these attacks did little to stop the overwhelming Bosnian Serb Army. The Bosnian Serb Army surrounded 150 UNPROFOR soldiers, taking them hostage in Goražde. Knowing Goražde would fall unless there was foreign intervention, NATO issued the Serbs an ultimatum, which they were forced to comply with. Under the conditions of the ultimatum, the Serbs had to withdraw all militias to 3 km from the town by 23 April 1994, and all of their artillery and armored vehicles 20 km (12 mi) from the town by 26 April 1994. The VRS complied.

==== Markale massacre ====
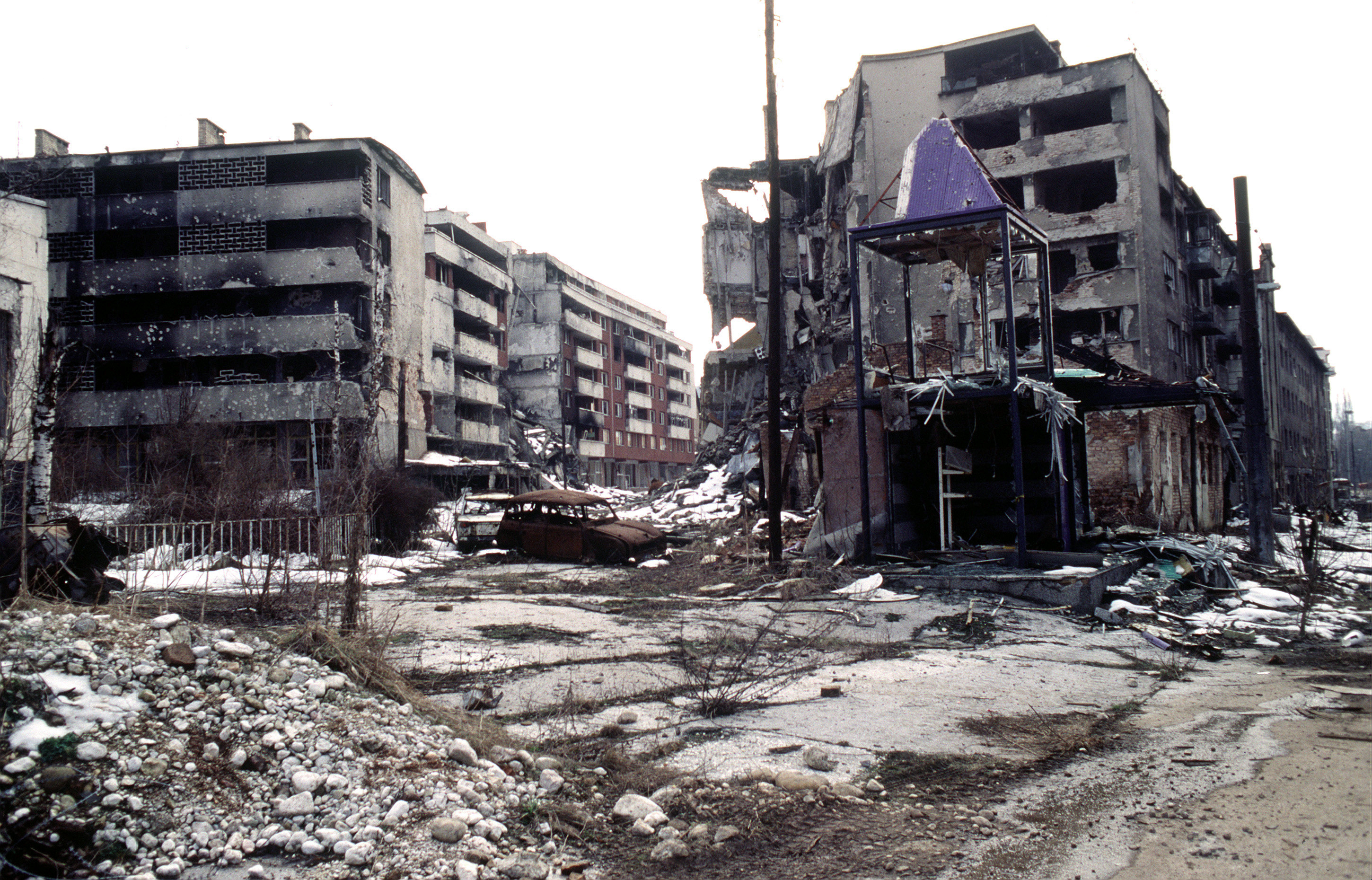
Damaged buildings in Grbavica during the Siege of Sarajevo

On 5 February 1994 Sarajevo suffered its deadliest single attack of the entire siege with the first Markale massacre, when a 120 millimeter artillery shell landed in the centre of the crowded marketplace, killing 68 people and wounding another 144. On 6 February, UN Secretary-General Boutros Boutros-Ghali formally requested NATO to confirm that future requests for air strikes would be carried out immediately.

On 9 February 1994, NATO authorised the Commander of Allied Forces Southern Europe (CINCSOUTH), US Admiral Jeremy Boorda, to launch air strikes—at the request of the UN—against artillery and mortar positions in or around Sarajevo determined by UNPROFOR to be responsible for attacks against civilian targets. Only Greece failed to support the use of air strikes, but did not veto the proposal.

NATO also issued an ultimatum to the Bosnian Serbs demanding the removal of heavy weapons around Sarajevo by midnight of 20–21 February, or they would face air strikes. On 12 February, Sarajevo enjoyed its first casualty free day since April 1992. The large-scale removal of Bosnian-Serb heavy weapons began on 17 February 1994.

==== Washington Agreement ====
The Croat-Bosniak war ended with the signing of a ceasefire agreement between the HVO Chief of Staff, general Ante Roso, and the ARBiH Chief of Staff, general Rasim Delić, on 23 February 1994 in Zagreb. The agreement went into effect on 25 February. A peace agreement known as the Washington Agreement, mediated by the US, was concluded on 2 March by representatives of the Republic of Bosnia and Herzegovina, Croatia and Herzeg-Bosnia. The agreement was signed on 18 March 1994 in Washington. Under this agreement, the combined territory held by the HVO and the ARBiH was divided into autonomous cantons within the Federation of Bosnia and Herzegovina. Tuđman and Izetbegović also signed a preliminary agreement on a confederation between Croatia and the Federation of Bosnia and Herzegovina. The Croat-Bosniak alliance was renewed, although the issues dividing them were not resolved.

The first military effort coordinated between the HVO and the ARBiH following the Washington Agreement was the advance towards Kupres, which was retaken from the VRS on 3 November 1994. On 29 November, the HV and the HVO initiated Operation Winter '94 in southwestern Bosnia. After a month of fighting, Croat forces had taken around 200 square kilometres (77 square miles) of VRS-held territory and directly threatened the main supply route between Republika Srpska and Knin, the capital of Republic of Serbian Krajina. The primary objective of relieving pressure on the Bihać pocket was not achieved, although the ARBiH repelled VRS attacks on the enclave.

==== UNPROFOR and NATO ====
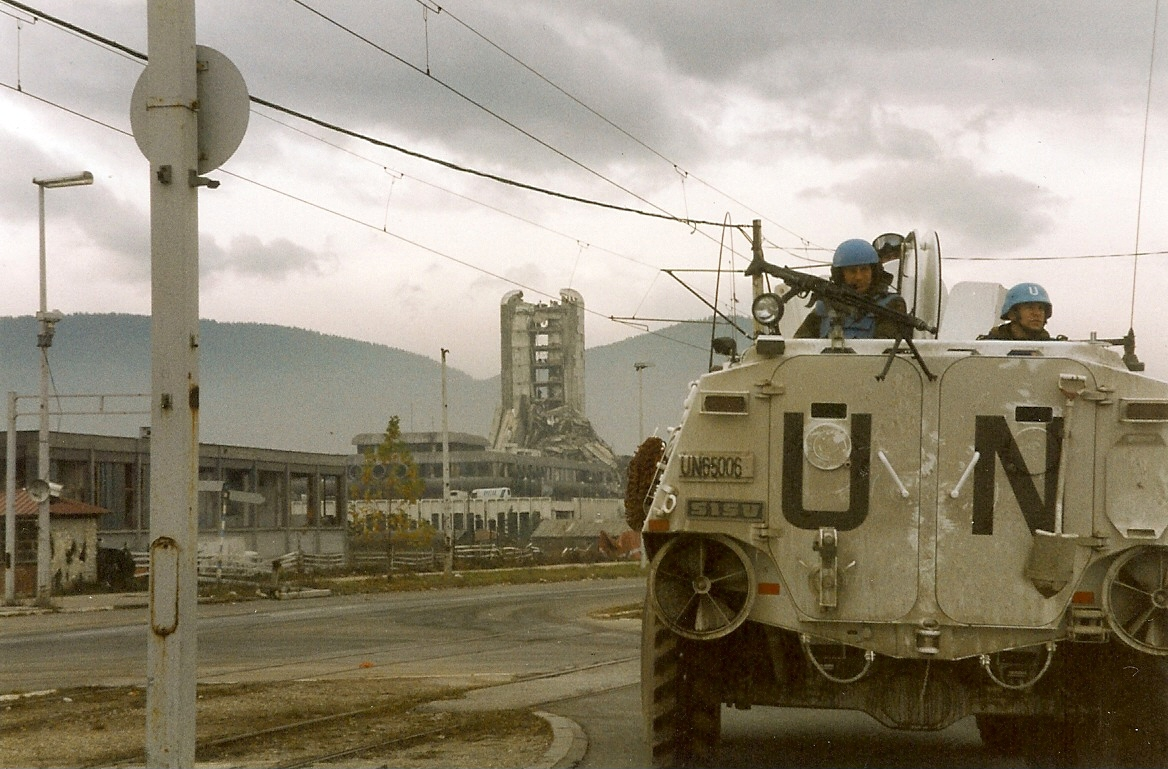
UN troops on their way up "Sniper Alley" in Sarajevo

NATO became actively involved when its jets shot down four Serb aircraft over central Bosnia on 28 February 1994 for violating the UN no-fly zone. On 12 March 1994, the United Nations Protection Force (UNPROFOR) made its first request for NATO air support, but close air support was not deployed, owing to a number of delays associated with the approval process. On 20 March an aid convoy with medical supplies and doctors reached Maglaj, a city of 100,000 people, which had been under siege since May 1993 and had been surviving off food supplies dropped by US aircraft. A second convoy on 23 March was hijacked and looted.

On 10–11 April 1994, UNPROFOR called in air strikes to protect the Goražde safe area, resulting in the bombing of a Serbian military command outpost near Goražde by two US F-16 jets. This was the first time in NATO's history it had conducted air strikes. In retaliation, Serbs took 150 U.N. personnel hostage on 14 April. On 15 April the Bosnian government lines around Goražde broke, and on 16 April a British Sea Harrier was shot down over Goražde by Serb forces.

Around 29 April 1994, a Danish contingent (Nordbat 2) on peacekeeping duty in Bosnia, as part of UNPROFOR's Nordic battalion located in Tuzla, was ambushed when trying to relieve a Swedish observation post (Tango 2) that was under heavy artillery fire by the Bosnian Serb Šekovići brigade at the village of Kalesija. The ambush was dispersed when the UN forces retaliated with heavy fire in what would be known as Operation Bøllebank.

On 12 May, the US Senate adopted S. 2042, introduced by Sen. Bob Dole, to unilaterally lift the arms embargo against the Bosnians, but it was repudiated by President Clinton. On 5 October 1994, Pub. L. 103–337 was signed by the President and stated that if the Bosnian Serbs had not accepted the Contact Group proposal by 15 October the President should introduce a UN Security Council proposal to end the arms embargo, and that if it was not passed by 15 November, only funds required by all UN members under Resolution 713 could be used to enforce the embargo, which would effectively end the embargo. On 12–13 November, the US unilaterally lifted the arms embargo against the government of Bosnia.

On 5 August, at the request of UNPROFOR, NATO aircraft attacked a target within the Sarajevo Exclusion Zone after weapons were seized by Bosnian Serbs from a weapons collection site near Sarajevo. On 22 September 1994, NATO aircraft carried out an air strike against a Bosnian Serb tank at the request of UNPROFOR. Operation Amanda was an UNPROFOR mission led by Danish peacekeeping troops, with the aim of recovering an observation post near Gradačac, Bosnia and Herzegovina, on 25 October 1994.

On 19 November 1994, the North Atlantic Council approved the extension of Close Air Support to Croatia for the protection of UN forces in that country. NATO aircraft attacked the Udbina airfield in Serb-held Croatia on 21 November, in response to attacks launched from that airfield against targets in the Bihać area of Bosnia and Herzegovina. On 23 November, after attacks launched from a surface-to-air missile site south of Otoka (north-west Bosnia and Herzegovina) on two NATO aircraft, air strikes were conducted against air defence radars in that area.

=== 1995 ===
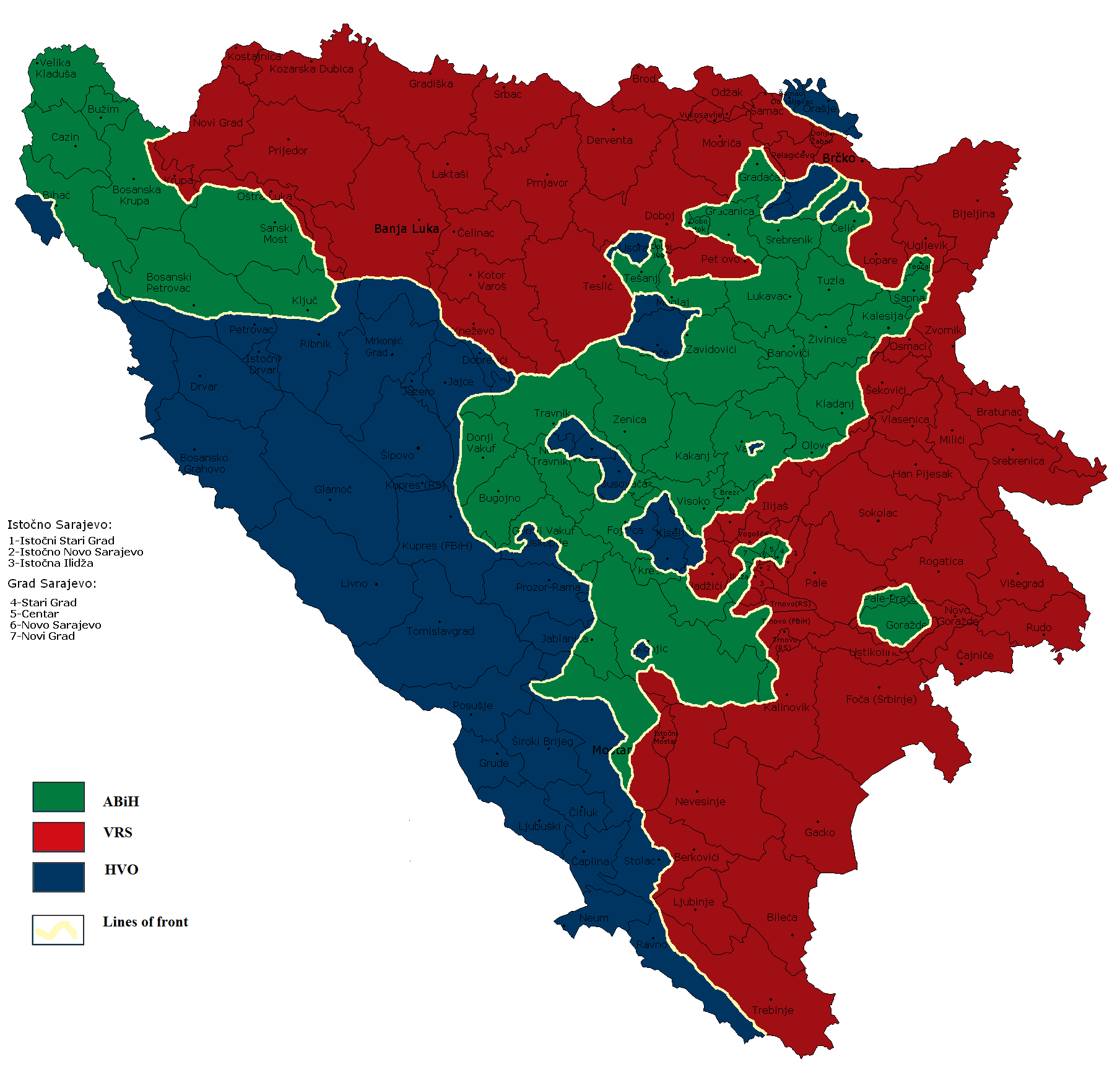
Bosnia and Herzegovina before the Dayton Agreement

On 25 May 1995, NATO bombed VRS positions in Pale due to their failure to return heavy weapons. The VRS then shelled all safe areas, including Tuzla. Approximately 70 civilians were killed and 150 were injured. During April and June, Croatian forces conducted two offensives known as Leap 1 and Leap 2. With these offensives, they secured the remainder of the Livno Valley and threatened the VRS-held town of Bosansko Grahovo.

On 27 May 1995, a confrontation occurred across the Vrbanja Bridge. During the battle, elements of the Bosnian Serb army stormed French-built UNPROFOR observation posts, taking hostage 10 French troops. The French Army, led by François Lecointre, sent about 100 UN-peacekeeping troops to the bridge, retaking the post and soon after the VRS withdrew.

On 11 July 1995, Army of Republika Srpska (VRS) forces under general Ratko Mladić occupied the UN "safe area" of Srebrenica in eastern Bosnia where more than 8,000 men were killed in the Srebrenica massacre (most women were expelled to Bosniak-held territory). The United Nations Protection Force (UNPROFOR), represented on the ground by a 400-strong contingent of Dutch peacekeepers, Dutchbat, failed to prevent the town's capture by the VRS and the subsequent massacre. The ICTY ruled this event as genocide in the Krstić case. On 25 July 1995, Serbs launched "Operation Stupčanica 95" to occupy the second UN "safe area", Žepa. UNPROFOR only sent 79 Ukrainian peacekeepers to Žepa.

In line with the Split Agreement signed between Tuđman and Izetbegović on 22 July, a joint military offensive by the HV and the HVO codenamed Operation Summer '95 took place in western Bosnia. The HV-HVO force gained control of Glamoč and Bosansko Grahovo and isolated Knin from Republika Srpska. On 4 August, the HV launched Operation Storm that effectively dissolved the Republic of Serbian Krajina. With this, the Bosniak-Croat alliance gained the initiative in the war, taking much of western Bosnia from the VRS in several operations in September and October. In Novi Grad, Croatian forces launched Operation Una, which began on 18 September 1995, when HV crossed the Una river and entered Bosnia. In 2006, Croatian authorities began investigating allegations of war crimes committed during this operation, specifically the killing of 40 civilians in the Bosanska Dubica area by troops of the 1st Battalion of the 2nd Guards Brigade.

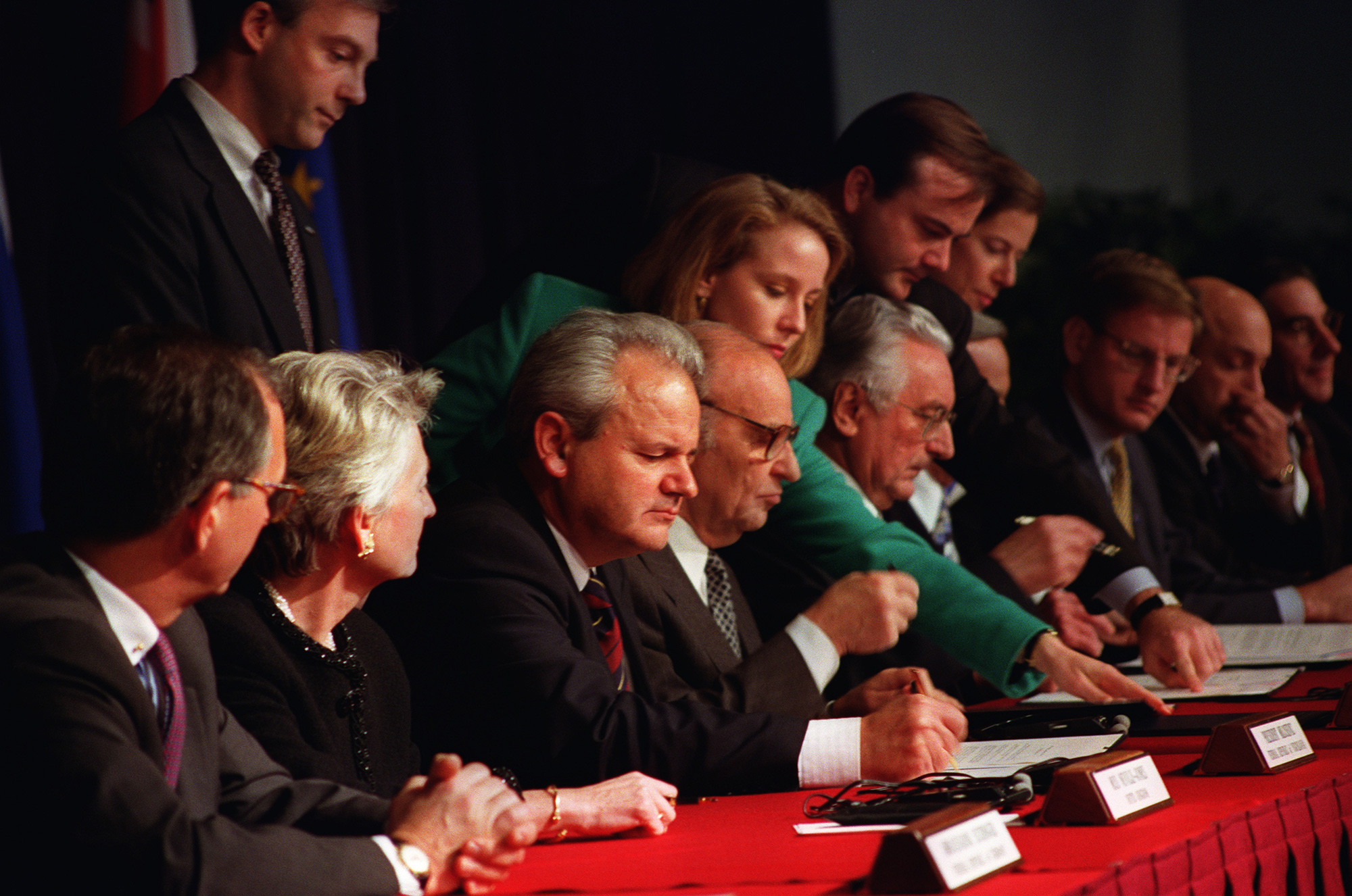
Seated from left to right: Slobodan Milošević, Alija Izetbegović and Franjo Tuđman formally signing the peace agreement in Paris on 14 December 1995.

The HV-HVO secured over 2,500 square kilometres (970 square miles) of territory during Operation Mistral 2, including the towns of Jajce, Šipovo and Drvar. At the same time, the ARBiH engaged the VRS further to the north in Operation Sana and captured several towns, including Bosanska Krupa, Bosanski Petrovac, Ključ and Sanski Most. A VRS counteroffensive against the ARBiH in western Bosnia was launched on 23/24 September. Within two weeks the VRS was in the vicinity of the town of Ključ. The ARBiH requested Croatian assistance and on 8 October the HV-HVO launched Operation Southern Move under the overall command of HV Major General Ante Gotovina. The VRS lost the town of Mrkonjić Grad, while HVO units came within 25 kilometres (16 miles) south of Banja Luka.

On 28 August, a VRS mortar attack on the Sarajevo Markale marketplace killed 43 people. In response to the second Markale massacre, on 30 August, the Secretary General of NATO announced the start of Operation Deliberate Force, widespread airstrikes against Bosnian Serb positions supported by UNPROFOR rapid reaction force artillery attacks. On 14 September 1995, the NATO air strikes were suspended to allow the implementation of an agreement with Bosnian Serbs for the withdrawal of heavy weapons from around Sarajevo. Twelve days later, on 26 September, an agreement of further basic principles for a peace accord was reached in New York City between the foreign ministers of Bosnia and Herzegovina, Croatia and the FRY. A 60-day ceasefire came into effect on 12 October, and on 1 November peace talks began in Dayton, Ohio. The war ended with the Dayton Peace Agreement initialed on 21 November 1995; the peace agreement was formally signed 14 December 1995 in Paris.

Following the Dayton Agreement, a NATO-led Implementation Force (IFOR) was deployed to Bosnia-Herzegovina. This 80,000 strong unit, was deployed in order to enforce the peace, as well as other tasks such as providing support for humanitarian and political aid, reconstruction, providing support for displaced civilians to return to their homes, collection of arms, and mine and unexploded ordnance clearing of the affected areas.

== Casualties ==
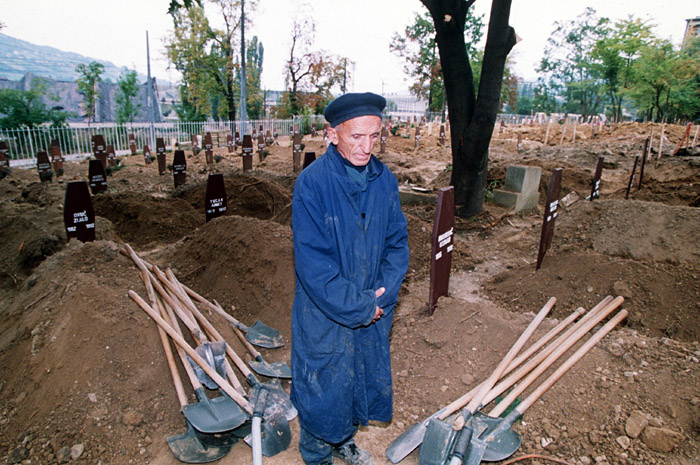
A grave digger at a cemetery in Sarajevo, 1992

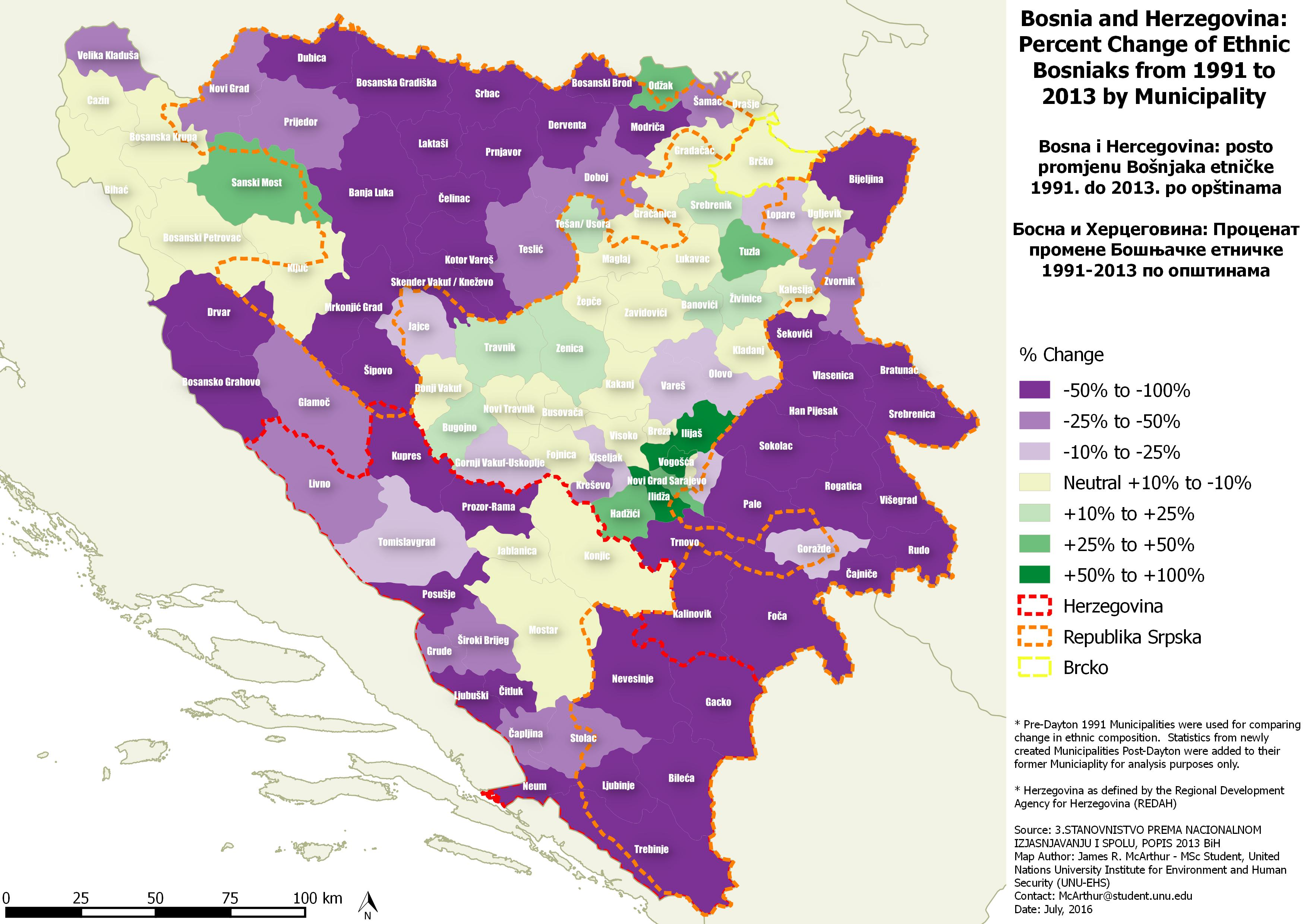
Bosnia and Herzegovina: Percent Change of Ethnic Bosniaks from 1991 to 2013

Calculating the number of deaths resulting from the conflict has been subject to considerable, highly politicised debate, sometimes "fused with narratives about victimhood", from the political elites of various groups. Estimates of the total number of casualties have ranged from 25,000 to 329,000. The variations are partly the result of the use of inconsistent definitions of who can be considered victims of the war, as some research calculated only direct casualties of military activity while other research included those who died from hunger, cold, disease or other war conditions. Early overcounts were also the result of many victims being entered in both civilian and military lists because little systematic coordination of those lists took place in wartime conditions. The death toll was originally estimated in 1994 at around 200,000 by Cherif Bassiouni, head of the UN expert commission investigating war crimes.

Steven L. Burg and Paul S. Shoup, writing in 1999, observed about early high figures:

The figure of 200,000 (or more) dead, injured, and missing was frequently cited in media reports on the war in Bosnia as late as 1994. The October 1995 bulletin of the Bosnian Institute for Public Health of the Republic Committee for Health and Social Welfare gave the numbers as 146,340 killed, and 174,914 wounded on the territory under the control of the Bosnian army. Mustafa Imamovic gave a figure of 144,248 perished (including those who died from hunger or exposure), mainly Muslims. The Red Cross and the UNHCR have not, to the best of our knowledge, produced data on the number of persons killed and injured in the course of the war. A November 1995 unclassified CIA memorandum estimated 156,500 civilian deaths in the country (all but 10,000 of them in Muslim- or Croat-held territories), not including the 8,000 to 10,000 then still missing from Srebrenica and Zepa enclaves. This figure for civilian deaths far exceeded the estimate in the same report of 81,500 troops killed (45,000 Bosnian government; 6,500 Bosnian Croat; and 30,000 Bosnian Serb).

=== RDC figures ===
Dead or disappeared figures according to RDC (as reported in June 2012)
Total dead or disappeared 101,040 (total includes unknown status below, percentages ignore "unknowns")	Bosniaks	62,013	61.4%
Total dead or disappeared 101,040 (total includes unknown status below, percentages ignore "unknowns")	Serbs	24,953	24.7%
Total dead or disappeared 101,040 (total includes unknown status below, percentages ignore "unknowns")	Croats	8,403	8.3%
Total dead or disappeared 101,040 (total includes unknown status below, percentages ignore "unknowns")	Other ethnicities	571	0.6%
Civilians; 38,239 (percentages are of civilian dead)	Bosniaks	31,107	81.3%
Civilians; 38,239 (percentages are of civilian dead)	Serbs	4,178	10.9%
Civilians; 38,239 (percentages are of civilian dead)	Croats	2,484	6.5%
Civilians; 38,239 (percentages are of civilian dead)	Other ethnicities	470	1.2%
Soldiers; 57,701 (percentages are of military dead)	Bosniaks	30,906	53.6%
Soldiers; 57,701 (percentages are of military dead)	Serbs	20,775	36%
Soldiers; 57,701 (percentages are of military dead)	Croats	5,919	10.3%
Soldiers; 57,701 (percentages are of military dead)	Other ethnicities	101	0.2%
Unknown status (percentage is of all dead or disappeared)	Ethnicity unstated	5,100	5%

In June 2007, the Sarajevo-based Research and Documentation Center published extensive research on the Bosnian war deaths, also called The Bosnian Book of the Dead, a database that initially revealed a minimum of 97,207 names of Bosnia and Herzegovina's citizens confirmed as killed or missing during the 1992–1995 war. The head of the UN war crimes tribunal's Demographic Unit, Ewa Tabeau, has called it "the largest existing database on Bosnian war victims", and it is considered the most authoritative account of human losses in the Bosnian war. More than 240,000 pieces of data were collected, checked, compared and evaluated by an international team of experts in order to produce the 2007 list of 97,207 victims' names.

The RDC 2007 figures stated that these were confirmed figures and that several thousand cases were still being examined. All of the RDC figures are believed to be a slight undercount as their methodology is dependent on a family member having survived to report the missing relative, though the undercount is not thought to be statistically significant. At least 30 percent of the 2007 confirmed Bosniak civilian victims were women and children.

The RDC published periodic updates of its figures until June 2012, when it published its final report. The 2012 figures recorded a total of 101,040 dead or disappeared, of whom 61.4 percent were Bosniaks, 24.7 percent were Serbs, 8.3 percent were Croats and less than 1 percent were of other ethnicities, with a further 5 percent whose ethnicity was unstated.

Civilian deaths were established as 38,239, which represented 37.9 percent of total deaths. Bosniaks accounted for 81.3 percent of those civilian deaths, compared to Serbs 10.9 percent and Croats 6.5 percent. The proportion of civilian victims is, moreover, an absolute minimum because the status of 5,100 victims was unestablished and because relatives were believed to have registered their dead loved ones as military victims in order to obtain veteran's financial benefits or for "honour" reasons.

Both the RDC and the ICTY's demographic unit applied statistical techniques to identify possible duplication caused by a given victim being recorded in multiple primary lists, the original documents being then hand-checked to assess duplication.

Some 30 categories of information existed within the database for each individual record, including basic personal information, place and date of death, and, in the case of soldiers, the military unit to which the individual belonged. This has allowed the database to present deaths by gender, military unit, year and region of death, in addition to ethnicity and "status in war" (civilian or soldier). The category intended to describe which military formation caused the death of each victim was the most incomplete and was deemed unusable.

=== ICTY figures ===
ICTY death estimates (issued by the Demographic Unit in 2010)
Total killed 104,732	Bosniaks	68,101
Total killed 104,732	Serbs	22,779
Total killed 104,732	Croats	8,858
Total killed 104,732	Others	4,995
Civilians killed 36,700	Bosniaks	25,609
Civilians killed 36,700	Serbs	7,480
Civilians killed 36,700	Croats	1,675
Civilians killed 36,700	Others	1,935
Soldiers killed 68,031 (includes Police)	Bosniaks	42,492
Soldiers killed 68,031 (includes Police)	Serbs	15,298
Soldiers killed 68,031 (includes Police)	Croats	7,182
Soldiers killed 68,031 (includes Police)	Others	3,058

Research conducted in 2010 for the Office of the Prosecutors at the Hague Tribunal, headed by Ewa Tabeau, pointed to errors in earlier figures and calculated the minimum number of victims as 89,186, with a probable figure of around 104,732. Tabeau noted the numbers should not be confused with "who killed who", because, for example, many Serbs were killed by the Serb army during the shelling of Sarajevo, Tuzla and other multi-ethnic cities. The authors of this report said that the actual death toll may be slightly higher.

These figures were not based solely on "battle deaths", but included accidental deaths taking place in battle conditions and acts of mass violence. Specifically excluded were "non-violent mortality increases" and "criminal and unorganised violence increases". Similarly "military deaths" included both combat and non-combat deaths.

=== Other statistics ===
There are no statistics dealing specifically with the casualties of the Croat-Bosniak conflict along ethnic lines. However, according to The RDC's data on human losses in the regions, in Central Bosnia 62 percent of the 10,448 documented deaths were Bosniaks, while Croats constituted 24 percent and Serbs 13 percent. The municipalities of Gornji Vakuf and Bugojno are geographically located in Central Bosnia (known as Gornje Povrbasje region), but the 1,337 region's documented deaths are included in Vrbas regional statistics. Approximately 70–80 percent of the casualties from Gornje Povrbasje were Bosniaks. In the region of Neretva river, of 6,717 casualties, 54 percent were Bosniaks, 24 percent Serbs and 21 percent Croats. The casualties in those regions were mainly, but not exclusively, the consequence of Croat-Bosniak conflict.

According to the UN, there were 167 fatalities amongst UNPROFOR personnel during the course of the force's mandate, from February 1992 to March 1995. Of those who died, three were military observers, 159 were other military personnel, one was a member of the civilian police, two were international civilian staff and two were local staff.

In a statement in September 2008 to the United Nations General Assembly, Haris Silajdžić said that "According to the ICRC data, 200,000 people were killed, 12,000 of them children, up to 50,000 women were raped, and 2.2 million were forced to flee their homes. This was a veritable genocide and sociocide". However, Silajdžić and others have been criticised for inflating the number of fatalities to attract international support. An ICRC book published in 2010 cites the total number killed in all of the Balkan wars in the 1990s as "about 140,000 people".

In 2012 Amnesty International reported that the fate of an estimated 10,500 people, most of whom were Bosnian Muslims, remained unknown at that time. Bodies of victims are still being unearthed two decades later. In July 2014 the remains of 284 victims, unearthed from the Tomašica mass grave near the town of Prijedor, were laid to rest in a mass ceremony in the northwestern town of Kozarac, attended by relatives.

The UNCHR stated that the conflict in Bosnia and Herzegovina forced more than 2.2 million people to flee their homes, at that time, the largest displacement of people in Europe since the end of World War II.

== War crimes ==
According to a report compiled by the UN, and chaired by M. Cherif Bassiouni, while all sides committed war crimes during the conflict, Serbian forces were responsible for ninety percent of them, whereas Croatian forces were responsible for six percent, and Bosniak forces four percent. The report echoed conclusions published by a Central Intelligence Agency estimate in 1995. In October 2019, a third of the war crime charges filed by the Bosnian state prosecution during the year were transferred to lower-level courts, which sparked criticism of prosecutors.

=== Ethnic cleansing ===
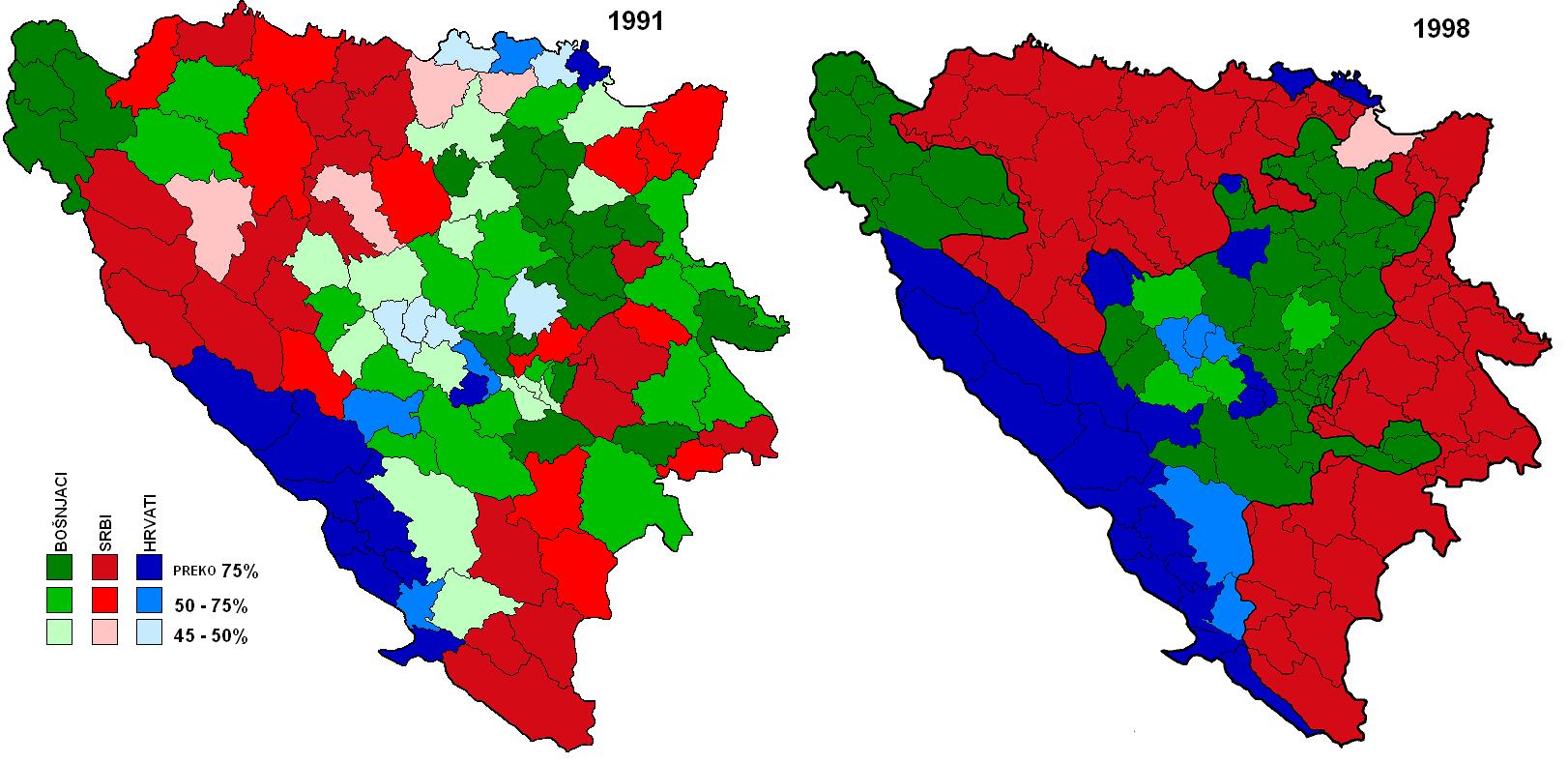
Ethnic distribution at the municipal level in Bosnia and Herzegovina before (1991) and after the war (1998). Bosniak shown in green, Serbian in red, and Croat in blue.

Ethnic cleansing was a common phenomenon in the war. Large numbers of Bosnian Muslims and Bosnian Croats were forced to flee their homes or were expelled by the Army of Republika Srpska and Serb paramilitaries. This entailed intimidation, forced expulsion, or killing of the unwanted ethnic group as well as the destruction of the places of worship, cemeteries and cultural and historical buildings of that ethnic group. Due to this, tens of thousands were killed, between one and 1.3 million deported or forcibly resettled, and 12,000 to 20,000 women raped. Academics Matjaž Klemenčič and Mitja Žagar argue that: "Ideas of nationalistic ethnic politicians that Bosnia and Herzegovina be reorganised into homogenous national territories inevitably required the division of ethnically mixed territories into their Serb, Croat, and Muslim parts". According to numerous ICTY verdicts and indictments, Serb and Croat forces performed ethnic cleansing of their territories to create ethnically pure states (Republika Srpska and Herzeg-Bosnia). Serb forces carried out the Srebrenica genocide towards the end of the war. Although comparatively rare, there were also cases of Bosniak forces forcing other ethnic groups to flee during the war. According to The New York Times, the Central Intelligence Agency concluded in a March 1995 report that Bosnian Serb forces had been responsible for 90 percent of the ethnic cleansing committed up to that time and that leading Serb politicians almost certainly knew of the crimes.

Based on the evidence of numerous HVO attacks, the ICTY Trial Chamber concluded in the Kordić and Čerkez case that by April 1993 Croat leadership had a common design or plan conceived and executed to ethnically cleanse Bosniaks from the Lašva Valley in Central Bosnia. Dario Kordić, as the local political leader, was found to be the planner and instigator of this plan.

=== Genocide ===
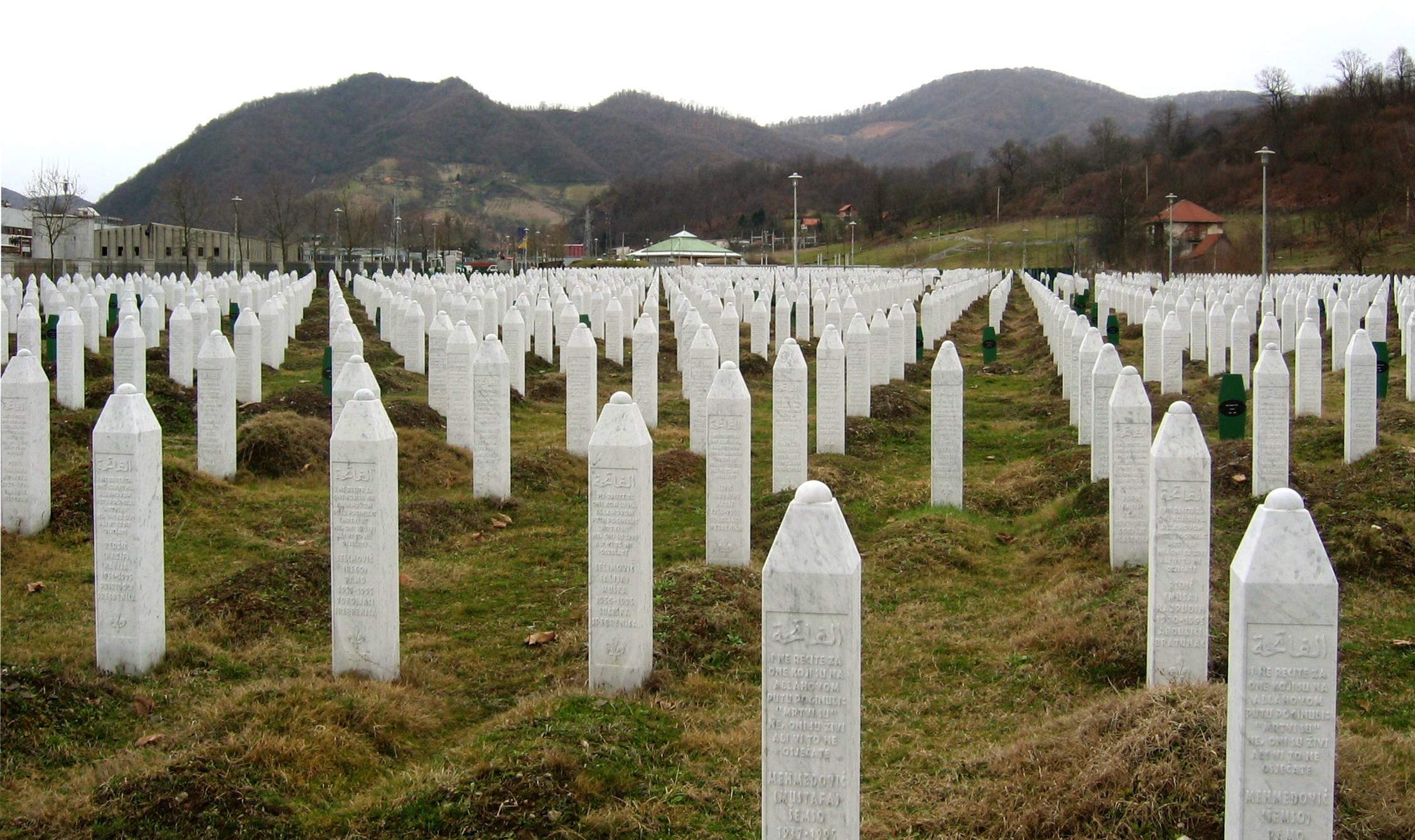
The cemetery at the Srebrenica-Potočari Memorial and Cemetery to Genocide Victims

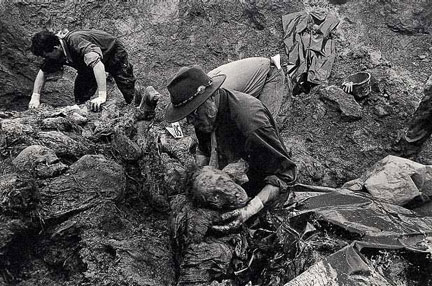
Exhumations in Srebrenica, 1996

The shield used as a symbol for the Bosniaks

A trial took place before the International Court of Justice, following a 1993 suit by Bosnia and Herzegovina against Serbia and Montenegro alleging genocide. The ICJ ruling of 26 February 2007 indirectly determined the war's nature to be international, though clearing Serbia of direct responsibility for the genocide committed by the forces of Republika Srpska. The ICJ concluded, however, that Serbia failed to prevent genocide committed by Serb forces and failed to punish those responsible, and bring them to justice. A telegram sent to the White House on 8 February 1994 and penned by U.S. Ambassador to Croatia, Peter W. Galbraith, stated that genocide was occurring. The telegram cited "constant and indiscriminate shelling and gunfire" of Sarajevo by Karadzic's Yugoslav People Army; the harassment of minority groups in Northern Bosnia "in an attempt to force them to leave"; and the use of detainees "to do dangerous work on the front lines" as evidence that genocide was being committed. In 2005, the United States Congress passed a resolution declaring that "the Serbian policies of aggression and ethnic cleansing meet the terms defining genocide".

Despite the evidence of many kinds of war crimes conducted simultaneously by different Serb forces in different parts of Bosnia and Herzegovina, especially in Bijeljina, Sarajevo, Prijedor, Zvornik, Banja Luka, Višegrad and Foča, the judges ruled that the criteria for genocide with the specific intent (dolus specialis) to destroy Bosnian Muslims were met only in Srebrenica or Eastern Bosnia in 1995.

The court concluded the crimes committed during the 1992–1995 war, may amount to crimes against humanity according to the international law, but that these acts did not, in themselves, constitute genocide per se. The Court further decided that, following Montenegro's declaration of independence in May 2006, Serbia was the only respondent party in the case, but that "any responsibility for past events involved at the relevant time the composite State of Serbia and Montenegro".

=== Rape ===
An estimated 12,000–50,000 women and girls were raped, most of them Bosnian Muslims with the majority of cases committed by Serb forces. This has been referred to as "Mass rape", particularly with regard to the coordinated use of rape as a weapon of war by members in the VRS and Bosnian Serb police. For the first time in judicial history, the International Criminal Tribunal for the former Yugoslavia (ICTY) declared that "systematic rape", and "sexual enslavement" in time of war was a crime against humanity, second only to the war crime of genocide. Rape was most systematic in Eastern Bosnia (e.g. during campaigns in Foča and Višegrad), and in Grbavica during the siege of Sarajevo. Women and girls were kept in various detention centres where they had to live in intolerably unhygienic conditions and were mistreated in many ways including being repeatedly raped. A notorious example was "Karaman's house" in Foča. Common complications among surviving women and girls include psychological, gynaecological and other physical disorders, as well as unwanted pregnancies and sexually transmitted diseases.

=== Prosecutions and legal proceedings ===
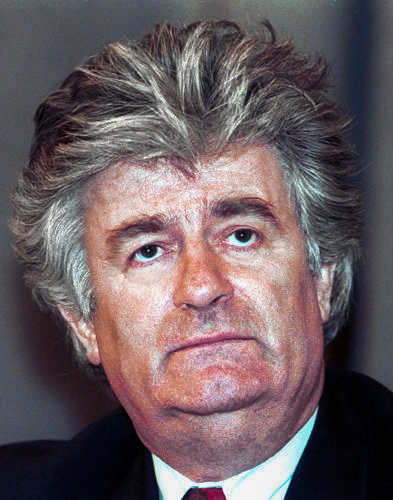
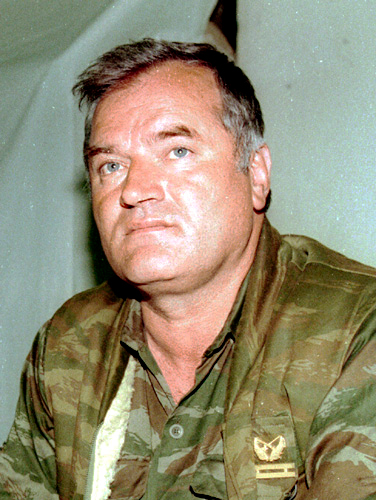
Radovan Karadžić (left), former president of Republika Srpska, Ratko Mladić (right), former Chief of Staff of the Army of the Republika Srpska, both sentenced by the ICTY

The International Criminal Tribunal for the former Yugoslavia (ICTY) was established in 1993 as a body of the UN to prosecute war crimes committed during the wars in the former Yugoslavia, and to try their perpetrators. The tribunal is an ad hoc court which is located in The Hague, the Netherlands.

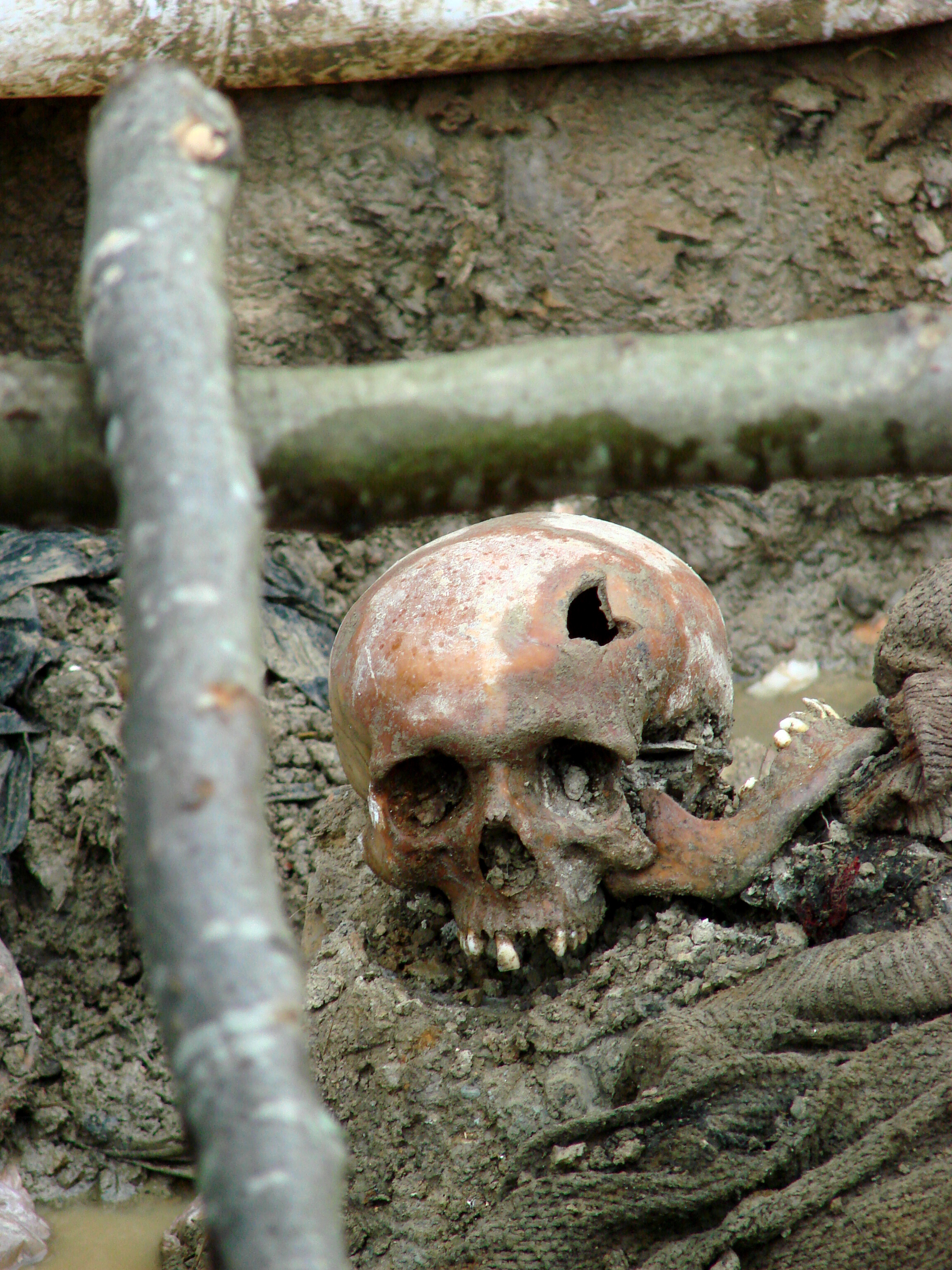
The skull of a victim of the July 1995 Srebrenica massacre in an exhumed mass grave outside of Potočari, 2007

According to legal experts, as of early 2008, 45 Serbs, 12 Croats and 4 Bosniaks were convicted of war crimes by the ICTY in connection with the Balkan wars of the 1990s. Both Serbs and Croats were indicted and convicted of systematic war crimes (joint criminal enterprise), while Bosniaks were indicted and convicted of individual ones. Most of the Bosnian Serb wartime leadership – Biljana Plavšić, Momčilo Krajišnik, Radoslav Brđanin, and Duško Tadić – were indicted and judged guilty for war crimes and ethnic cleansing.

The former president of Republika Srpska Radovan Karadžić was held on trial and sentenced to life in prison for crimes, including crimes against humanity and genocide. Ratko Mladić was also tried by the ICTY, charged with crimes against humanity and genocide. In connection with the siege of Sarajevo and the Srebrenica massacre. Mladić was found guilty and sentenced to life imprisonment by The Hague in November 2017. Paramilitary leader Vojislav Šešelj was on trial from 2007 to 2018, accused of being a part of a joint criminal enterprise to ethnically cleanse large areas of Bosnia-Herzegovina of non-Serbs. The Serbian president Slobodan Milošević was charged with war crimes in connection with the war in Bosnia, including grave breaches of the Geneva Conventions, crimes against humanity and genocide, but died in 2006 before the trial could finish.

Boljanić (left), where a civilian was killed in an attack responsible by Džemal Jukan, Lukavac (right), where Serbs were unlawfully detained, tortured, and killed during the Bosnian War

After the death of Alija Izetbegović, The Hague revealed that an ICTY investigation of Izetbegović had been in progress which ended with his death. Bosniaks who were convicted of or were tried for war crimes include Rasim Delić, chief of staff of the Army of Bosnia and Herzegovina, who was sentenced to three years' imprisonment on 15 September 2008 for his failure to prevent the Bosnian mujahideen members of the Bosnian army from committing crimes against captured civilians and enemy combatants. Enver Hadžihasanović, a general of the Army of the Republic of Bosnia and Herzegovina, was sentenced to 3.5 years for authority over acts of murder and wanton destruction in Central Bosnia. Hazim Delić was the Bosniak Deputy Commander of the Čelebići prison camp, which detained Serb civilians. He was sentenced to 18 years by the ICTY Appeals Chamber on 8 April 2003 for murder and torture of the prisoners and for raping two Serbian women. Bosnian commander Sefer Halilović was charged with one count of violation of the laws and customs of war on the basis of superior criminal responsibility of the incidents during Operation Neretva '93 and found not guilty. In 2006, Bosniak commander Naser Orić was sentenced to two years' imprisonment by the ICTY for his failure, as a superior, to prevent the murder and abuses of Bosnian Serb detainees in detention facilities between December 1992 and March 1993. However, on 3 July 2008, the ICTY Appeals Chamber overturned his convictions and acquitted him. He was later accused of more war crimes, but the Court of Bosnia and Herzegovina acquitted him of those charges. In October 2024, 7 Bosnians were jailed for periods between 2 and 7 years for the unlawful detention, torture and murder of Serbian civilian detainees in the municipality of Lukavac between June and October 1992. On 23 June 2026, wartime commander of the 221st Mountain Brigade, Džemal Jukan, was sentenced to a non-final seven years in prison by the District Court in Doboj following a retrial after the Supreme Court of Republika Srpska overturned a previous acquittal. Jukan was convicted of ordering an anti-aircraft machine gun to shoot at buses and ordering attacks on Boljanić, both resulting in civilian deaths. Generally, Serbs have accused Sarajevo authorities of practicing selective justice by actively prosecuting Serbs while ignoring or downplaying Bosniak war crimes.

Dario Kordić, political leader of Croats in Central Bosnia, was convicted of the crimes against humanity in Central Bosnia i.e. ethnic cleansing and sentenced to 25 years in prison. On 29 May 2013, in a first instance verdict, the ICTY sentenced Prlić to 25 years in prison. The tribunal also convicted five other war time leaders of the joint trial: defence minister of Herzeg-Bosnia Bruno Stojić (20 years), military officers Slobodan Praljak (20 years) and Milivoj Petković (20 years), military police commander Valentin Ćorić (20 years), and head of prisoner exchanges and detention facilities Berislav Pušić (10 years). The Chamber ruled, by majority, with the presiding judge Jean-Claude Antonetti dissenting, that they took part in a joint criminal enterprise (JCE) against the non-Croat population of Bosnia and Herzegovina and that the JCE included the Croatian President Franjo Tuđman, Defence Minister Gojko Šušak, and general Janko Bobetko. However, on 19 July 2016 the Appeals Chamber in the case announced that the "Trial Chamber made no explicit findings concerning [Tudjman's, Šušak's and Bobetko's] participation in the JCE and did not find [them] guilty of any crimes."

Genocide at Srebrenica is the most serious war crime that any Serbs were convicted of. Crimes against humanity is the most serious war crime that any Bosniaks or Croats were convicted of.

=== Reconciliation ===
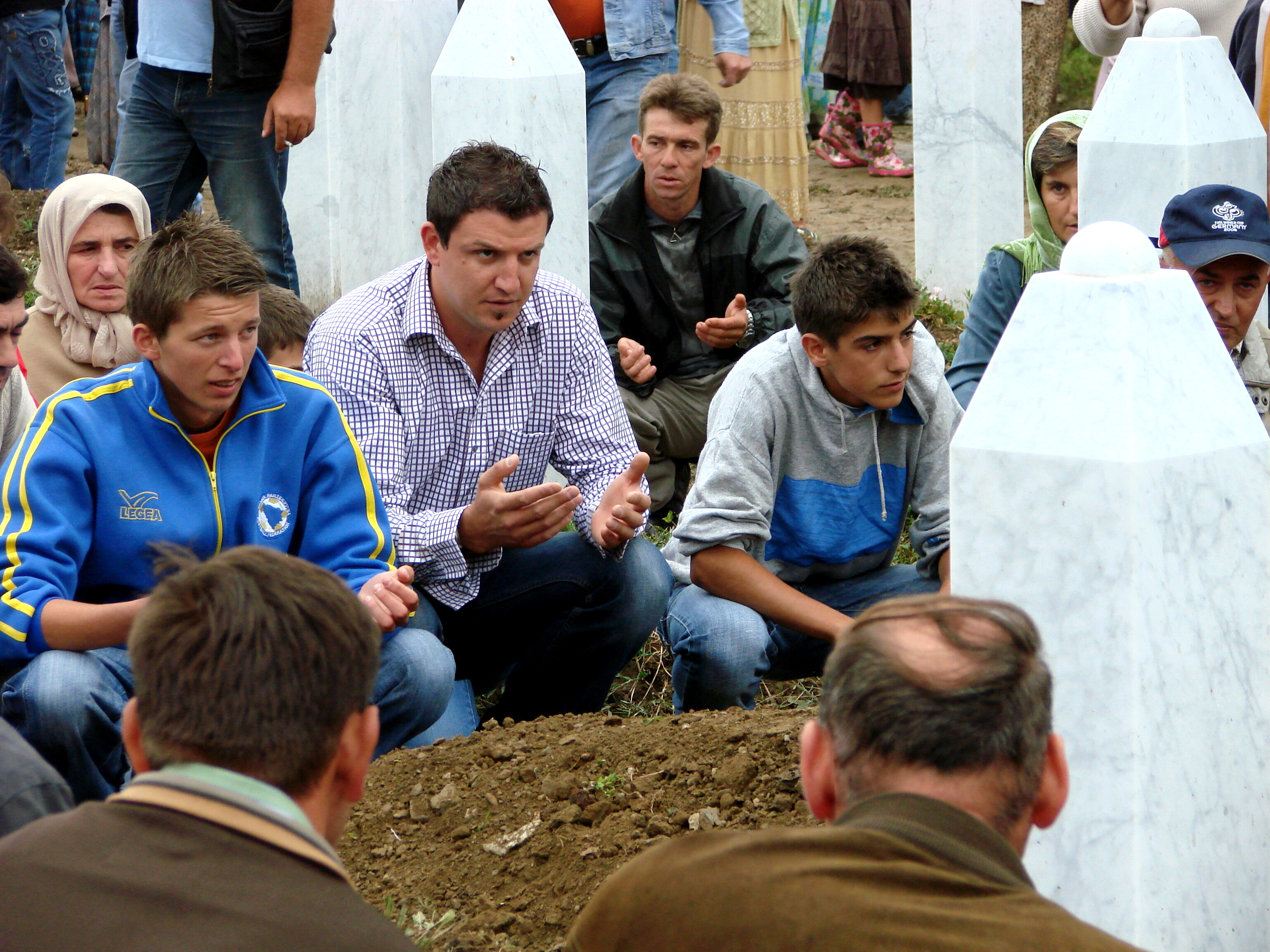
Mourners at the reburial ceremony for an exhumed victim of the Srebrenica massacre

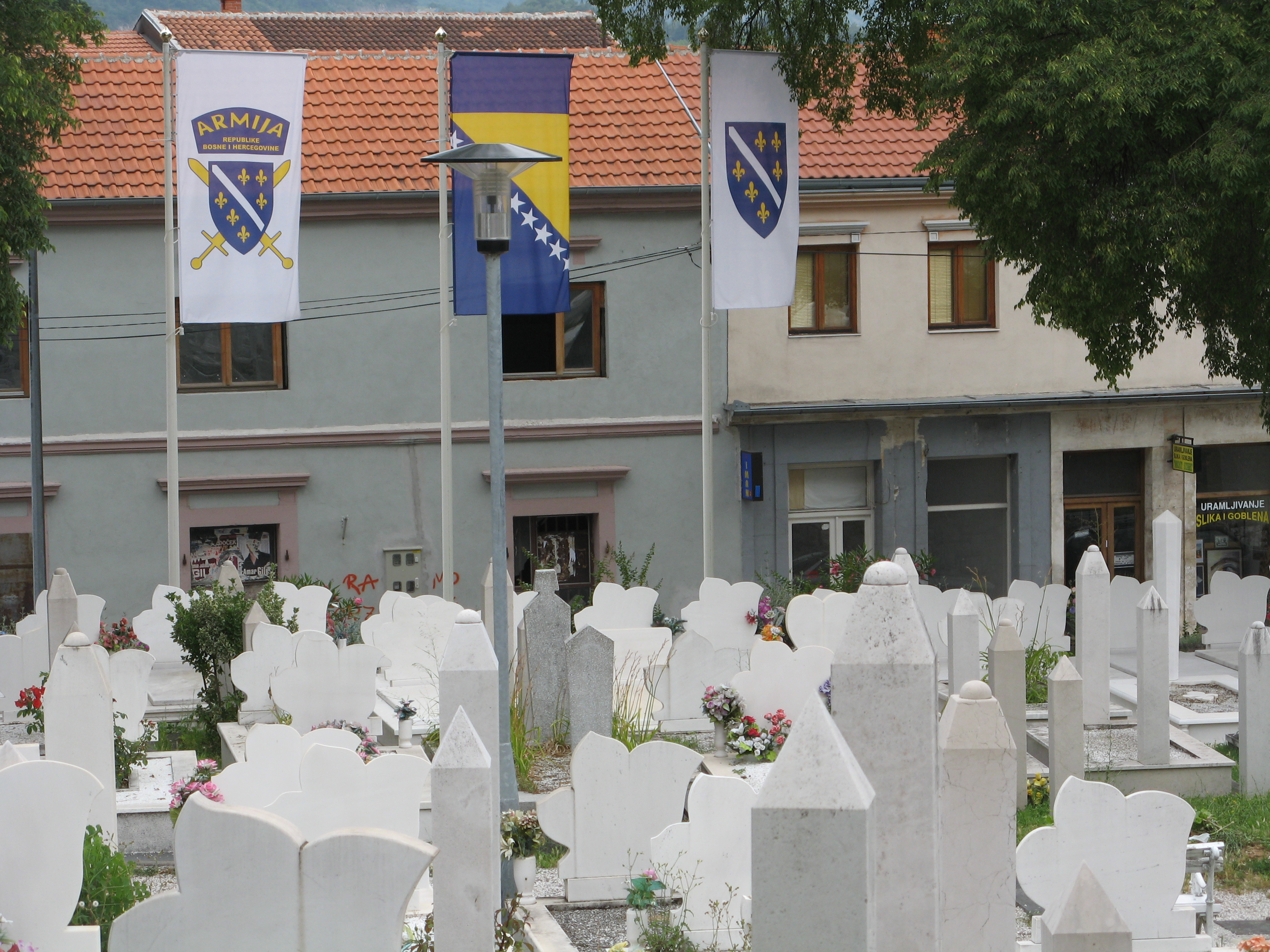
A cemetery in Mostar flying the flag of Army of the Republic of Bosnia and Herzegovina (left), the flag of Bosnia and Herzegovina, and the flag of the Republic of Bosnia and Herzegovina

On 6 December 2004, Serbian president Boris Tadić made an apology in Bosnia and Herzegovina to all those who suffered crimes committed in the name of the Serb people.

Croatia's president Ivo Josipović apologised in April 2010 for his country's role in the Bosnian War. Bosnia and Herzegovina's then-president Haris Silajdžić in turn praised relations with Croatia, remarks that starkly contrasted with his harsh criticism of Serbia the day before. "I'm deeply sorry that the Republic of Croatia has contributed to the suffering of people and divisions which still burden us today", Josipović told Bosnia and Herzegovina's parliament.

On 31 March 2010, the Serbian parliament adopted a declaration "condemning in strongest terms the crime committed in July 1995 against Bosniak population of Srebrenica" and apologizing to the families of the victims, the first of its kind in the region. The initiative to pass a resolution came from President Boris Tadić, who pushed for it even though the issue was politically controversial. In the past, only human rights groups and non-nationalistic parties had supported such a measure.

== Assessment ==
=== Civil war or a war of aggression ===
Due to the involvement of Croatia and Serbia, there has been a long-standing debate as to whether the conflict was a civil war or a war of aggression on Bosnia by neighbouring states. Academics Steven Burg and Paul Shoup argue that:

From the outset, the nature of the war in Bosnia-Herzegovina was subject to conflicting interpretations. These were rooted not only in objective facts on the ground, but in the political interests of those articulating them.

On the one hand, the war could be viewed as "a clear-cut case of civil war – that is, of internal war among groups unable to agree on arrangements for sharing power".

David Campbell is critical of narratives about "civil war", which he argues often involve what he terms "moral levelling", in which all sides are "said to be equally guilty of atrocities", and "emphasise credible Serb fears as a rationale for their actions".

In contrast to the civil war explanation, Bosniaks, many Croats, western politicians and human rights organizations claimed that the war was a war of Serbian and Croatian aggression based on the Karađorđevo and Graz agreements, while Serbs often considered it a civil war.

Bosnian Serbs and Bosnian Croats enjoyed substantial political and military backing from Serbia and Croatia, and the decision to grant Bosnia diplomatic recognition also had implications for the international interpretation of the conflict. As Burg and Shoup state:

From the perspective of international diplomacy and law...the international decision to recognize the independence of Bosnia-Herzegovina and grant it membership in the United Nations provided a basis for defining the war as a case of external aggression by both Serbia and Croatia. With respect to Serbia, the further case could be made that the Bosnian Serb army was under the de facto command of the Yugoslav army and was therefore an instrument of external aggression. With respect to Croatia, regular Croatian army forces violated the territorial integrity of Bosnia-Herzegovina, lending further evidence in support of the view that this was a case of aggression.

Sumantra Bose, meanwhile, argues that it is possible to characterise the Bosnian War as a civil war, without necessarily agreeing with the narrative of Serb and Croat nationalists. He states that while "all episodes of severe violence have been sparked by 'external' events and forces, local society too has been deeply implicated in that violence" and therefore argues that "it makes relatively more sense to regard the 1992–95 conflict in Bosnia as a 'civil war' – albeit obviously with a vital dimension that is territorially external to Bosnia".

In the cases involving Duško Tadić and Zdravko Mucić, the ICTY concluded that the conflict between Bosnia and Herzegovina and Federal Republic of Yugoslavia was an international one:

[F]or the period material to this case (1992), the armed forces of the Republika Srpska were to be regarded as acting under the overall control of and on behalf of the FRY (the Federal Republic of Yugoslavia). Hence, even after 19 May 1992 the armed conflict in Bosnia and Herzegovina between the Bosnian Serbs and the central authorities of Bosnia and Herzegovina must be classified as an international armed conflict.

Similarly, in the cases involving Ivica Rajić, Tihomir Blaškić and Dario Kordić, the ICTY concluded that the conflict between Bosnia and Herzegovina and Croatia was also an international one:

[F]or purposes of the application of the grave breaches provisions of Geneva Convention IV, the significant and continuous military action by the armed forces of Croatia in support of the Bosnian Croats against the forces of the Bosnian Government on the territory of the latter was sufficient to convert the domestic conflict between the Bosnian Croats and the Bosnian Government into an international one.

In 2010, Bosnian Commander Ejup Ganić was detained in London on a Serbian extradition request for alleged war crimes. Judge Timothy Workman decided that Ganić should be released after ruling that Serbia's request was "politically motivated". In his decision, he characterised the Bosnian War to have been an international armed conflict as Bosnia had declared independence on 3 March 1992.

Academic Mary Kaldor argues that the Bosnian War is an example of what she terms new wars, which are neither civil nor inter-state, but rather combine elements of both.

=== Ethnic war ===
In The Myth of Ethnic War: Serbia and Croatia in the 1990s, Ithaca College Professor V.P. Gagnon challenges the widely accepted belief in the West that the Bosnian War (and the other Yugoslav wars) were a product of ethnic hatred between the warring factions. Gagnon argues that the wars were caused by power-hungry political elites who resisted political and economical liberalization and democratization, not ordinary people. In disputing the common assessment by Western academics, politicians and journalists of an ethnic war and of the Balkans as a region antithetical to Western values, Gagnon cites high intermarriage rates, the high percentage of draft-resisters, resistance to nationalist movements and favourable views of inter-ethnic relations in polling conducted in the late 1980s in Yugoslavia among other factors.

== In popular culture ==
=== Film ===
The Bosnian War has been depicted in a number of films including Hollywood films such as The Hunting Party, starring Richard Gere as journalist Simon Hunt in his bid to apprehend suspected war criminal and former Bosnian Serb president Radovan Karadžić; Behind Enemy Lines, loosely based on the Mrkonjić Grad incident, tells about a downed US Navy pilot who uncovers a massacre while on the run from Serb troops who want him dead; The Peacemaker, starring George Clooney and Nicole Kidman, is a story about a US Army colonel and a White House nuclear expert investigating stolen Russian nuclear weapons obtained by a revenge-fueled Yugoslav diplomat, Dušan Gavrić.

In the Land of Blood and Honey is a 2011 American film written, produced and directed by Angelina Jolie; the film was Jolie's directorial debut and it depicts a love story set against the mass rape of Muslim women in the Bosnian War. The 2013 Spanish/Italian film Twice Born, starring Penélope Cruz and based on a book by Margaret Mazzantini, tells the story of a mother who brings her teenage son to Sarajevo, where his father died in the Bosnian conflict years ago.

British films include Welcome to Sarajevo, about the life of Sarajevans during the siege. The Bosnian-British film Beautiful People directed by Jasmin Dizdar portrays the encounter between English families and arriving Bosnian refugees at the height of the Bosnian War. The film was awarded the Un Certain Regard at the 1999 Cannes Festival. The Spanish film Territorio Comanche shows the story of a Spanish TV crew during the siege of Sarajevo. The Polish film Demons of War (1998), set during the Bosnian conflict, portrays a group of Polish soldiers in IFOR who help a pair of journalists tracked by a local warlord whose crimes they had taped.

Bosnian director Danis Tanović's No Man's Land won the Best Foreign Language Film awards at the 2001 Academy Awards and the 2002 Golden Globes. The Bosnian film Grbavica, about the life of a single mother in contemporary Sarajevo in the aftermath of systematic rape of Bosniak women by Serbian troops during the war, won the Golden Bear at the Berlin International Film Festival.

The 2003 film Remake, directed by Bosnian director Dino Mustafić and written by Zlatko Topčić, follows father Ahmed and son Tarik Karaga during World War II and the Siege of Sarajevo. It premiered at the 32nd International Film Festival Rotterdam. The 2010 film The Abandoned, directed by Adis Bakrač and written by Zlatko Topčić, tells the story of a boy from a home for abandoned children who tries to find the truth about his origins, it being implied that he is the child of a rape. The film premiered at the 45th Karlovy Vary International Film Festival.

The 1997 film The Perfect Circle, directed by Bosnian filmmaker Ademir Kenović, tells the story of two boys during the Siege of Sarajevo and was awarded with the François Chalais Prize at the 1997 Cannes Festival.

The 1998 film Savior, starring Dennis Quaid tells the story of a hardened mercenary in the Foreign Legion who begins to find his own humanity when confronted with atrocities during the fighting in Bosnia.

Pretty Village, Pretty Flame directed by Serbian filmmaker Srđan Dragojević, presents a bleak yet darkly humorous account of the Bosnian War. The Serbian film Life Is a Miracle, produced by Emir Kusturica, depicts the romance of a pacific Serb station caretaker and a Muslim Bosniak young woman entrusted to him as a hostage in the context of Bosniak-Serb border clashes; it was nominated at the 2004 Cannes Festival.

Short films include In the Name of the Son, about a father who murders his son during the Bosnian War, and 10 Minutes, which contrasts 10 minutes of life of a Japanese tourist in Rome with a Bosnian family during the war. 10 Minutes was awarded Best short film of 2002 by the European Film Academy.

A number of Western films have used the Bosnian conflict as their background – these include Avenger, based on Frederick Forsyth's novel in which a mercenary tracks down a Serbian warlord responsible for war crimes, and The Peacemaker, in which a devastated Yugoslav man plots to take revenge on the United Nations by exploding a nuclear bomb in New York. The Whistleblower is based on the story of Kathryn Bolkovac, a UN peacekeeper who uncovered a sex trafficking scandal in post-war Bosnia. Shot Through the Heart is a 1998 TV film, directed by David Attwood, shown on BBC and HBO in 1998, which covers the Siege of Sarajevo during the Bosnian War from the perspective of two Olympic-level Yugoslavian marksmen, one whom becomes a sniper.

Quo Vadis, Aida? is a 2020 Bosnian film, written and directed by Jasmila Žbanić, about Aida, a UN translator who tries to save her family after the Army of Republika Srpska takes over the city of Srebrenica immediately prior to the Srebrenica massacre.

==== Drama series ====
The award-winning British television series, Warriors, aired on BBC One in 1999. It tells the story of a group of British peacekeepers during the Lašva Valley ethnic cleansing. Many of the war's events were depicted in the Pakistani drama series, Alpha Bravo Charlie, written and directed by Shoaib Mansoor in 1998. Produced by the Inter-Services Public Relations (ISPR), the series showed several active battlefield events and the involvement of Pakistan military personnel in the UN peacekeeping missions. Alpha Bravo Charlie was presented on Pakistan Television Corporation (PTV).

==== Documentaries ====
A BBC documentary series, The Death of Yugoslavia, covers the collapse of Yugoslavia from the roots of the conflict in the 1980s to the subsequent wars and peace accords, and a BBC book was issued with the same title. Other documentaries include Bernard-Henri Lévy's Bosna! about Bosnian resistance against well equipped Serbian troops at the beginning of the war; the Slovenian documentary Tunel upanja (A Tunnel of Hope) about the Sarajevo Tunnel constructed by the besieged citizens of Sarajevo to link Sarajevo with Bosnian government territory; and the British documentary A Cry from the Grave about the Srebrenica massacre. Miracle in Bosnia is a 1995 documentary film shot on the occasion of the third anniversary of the Army of the Republic of Bosnia and Herzegovina; it premiered at the 1995 Cannes Film Festival and won the Special Award. The Bosnian War is a central focus in The Diplomat, a documentary about the career of Richard Holbrooke. Yugoslavia: The Avoidable War (1999) looks at the wider context of the ex-Yugoslavian civil wars. Scream for Me Sarajevo is a 2017 documentary directed by Tarik Hodzic about a concert played by Bruce Dickinson, the lead singer of an English heavy metal band Iron Maiden and his band Skunkworks, in Sarajevo, in late 1994, during the siege.

=== Books ===
Semezdin Mehmedinović's Sarajevo Blues and Miljenko Jergović's Sarajevo Marlboro are among the best known books written during the war in Bosnia. Zlata's Diary is a published diary kept by a young girl, Zlata Filipović, which chronicles her life in Sarajevo from 1991 to 1993. Because of the diary, she is sometimes referred to as "The Anne Frank of Sarajevo". The Bosnia List by Kenan Trebincevic and Susan Shapiro chronicles the war through the eyes of a Bosnian refugee returning home for the first time after 18 years in New York.

Other works about the war include:

- Bosnia Warriors: Living on the Front Line, by Major Vaughan Kent-Payne is an account of UN operations in Bosnia written by A British Army infantry officer who was based in Vitez, Central Bosnia for seven months in 1993.
- Necessary Targets (by Eve Ensler)
- Winter Warriors – Across Bosnia with the PBI by Les Howard, a factual account by a British Territorial infantryman who volunteered to serve as a UN Peacekeeper in the latter stages of the war, and during the first stages of the NATO led Dayton Peace Accord.
- Pretty Birds, by Scott Simon, depicts a teenage girl in Sarajevo, once a basketball player on her high school team, who becomes a sniper.
- The Cellist of Sarajevo, by Steven Galloway, is a novel following the stories of four people living in Sarajevo during the war and the impact it has on them.
- Life's Too Short to Forgive, written in 2005 by Len Biser, follows the efforts of three people who unite to assassinate Karadzic to stop Serb atrocities.
- Fools Rush In, written by Bill Carter, tells the story of a man who helped bring U2 to a landmark Sarajevo concert.
- Evil Doesn't Live Here, by Daoud Sarhandi and Alina Boboc, presents 180 posters created by Bosnian artist which plastered walls during the war.
- The Avenger by Frederick Forsyth.
- Hotel Sarajevo by Jack Kersh.
- Top je bio vreo by Vladimir Kecmanović, a story of a Bosnian Serb boy in the part of Sarajevo held by Bosnian Muslim forces during the Siege of Sarajevo.
- I Bog je zaplakao nad Bosnom (And God cried over Bosnia), written by Momir Krsmanović, is a depiction of war that mainly focuses on the crimes committed by Muslim people.
- Safe Area Goražde is a graphic novel by Joe Sacco about the war in eastern Bosnia.
- Dampyr is an Italian comic book, created by Mauro Boselli and Maurizio Colombo and published in Italy by Sergio Bonelli Editore about Harlan Draka, half human, half vampire, who wages war on the multifaceted forces of Evil. The first two episodes are located in Bosnia and Herzegovina (#1 Il figlio del Diavolo) i.e. Sarajevo (#2 La stirpe della note) during the Bosnian War.
- Goodbye Sarajevo – A True Story of Courage, Love and Survival by Atka Reid and Hana Schofield and published in 2011, is the story of two sisters from Sarajevo and their separate experiences of the war.
- Love Thy Neighbor: A Story of War (by Peter Maass), published in 1997 is his account as a reporter at the height of the Bosnian War.
- Shrader, Charles R. (2003). The Muslim-Croat Civil War in Central Bosnia: A Military History, 1992–1994. College Station, Texas: Texas A&M University Press. ISBN 978-1-58544-261-4.
- My War Gone By, I Miss It So by Anthony Loyd is a memoir of Loyd's time spent covering the conflict as a photojournalist and writer.
- The Pepperdogs, a 2004 novel by Bing West, features a United States Marine Corps Force Reconnaissance team caught between sides during the NATO peacekeeping effort.

=== Music ===
- "Miss Sarajevo" by U2, featuring Bono and Luciano Pavarotti.
- "Pure Massacre" by Silverchair.
- "Bosnia" by the Cranberries.
- "Sarajevo" by UHF.
- "Sarajevo" by Greek rock band Magic De Spell
- "Sva bol svijeta" by Fazla.
- "Nad trupem Jugosławii" by Polish punk rock band KSU.
- "Sarajevo" by South African rock band Jack Hammer.
- The concept album Dead Winter Dead by Savatage tells a story set during the Bosnian War.
- American rock band Jackopierce wrote the song "Anderson's Luck" from their album Weather based on the siege, describing the life of a couple trying to survive in Sarajevo contrasted with the singer's family, safely watching the events unfold on television.
- "Adnan's" by English techno duo Orbital, inspired by a story about "a family evacuated from the former Yugoslavia. The father had to stay behind to work, and his 16-year-old son decided he had to go back and stay with him. He felt he couldn't leave him on his own. After a few days the son, Adnan, got blown up and killed."

=== Video games ===
The 2014 video game This War of Mine was inspired by the poor living conditions and wartime atrocities that Bosnian civilians endured during the Siege of Sarajevo where the player controls a group of civilian survivors in a makeshift-damaged house.

== See also ==
- 1991 population census in Bosnia and Herzegovina
- 1995 NATO bombing in Bosnia and Herzegovina
- Armed Forces of Bosnia and Herzegovina
- Command responsibility
- High Representative for Bosnia and Herzegovina
- International Residual Mechanism for Criminal Tribunals – mandated to the remaining functions of the ICTY
- Land mine contamination in Bosnia and Herzegovina
- List of massacres in the Bosnian War
- Role of the media in the Yugoslav wars
- Sarajevo Safari

== Bibliography ==
=== Books ===
- Bethlehem, Daniel; Weller, Marc (1997). The Yugoslav Crisis in International Law. Cambridge University Press. ISBN 9780521463041.
- Bose, Sumantra (2002). Bosnia After Dayton: Nationalist Partition and International Intervention. C. Hurst & Co. Publishers. ISBN 978-1-85065-585-5.
- Bose, Sumantra (2009). Contested Lands. Harvard University Press. ISBN 978-0-674-02856-2.
- Burg, Steven L.; Shoup, Paul S. (2015). Ethnic Conflict and International Intervention: Crisis in Bosnia-Herzegovina, 1990-93. Taylor & Francis. ISBN 978-1-317-47101-1.
- Burg, Steven L.; Shoup, Paul S. (1999). The War in Bosnia-Herzegovina: Ethnic Conflict and International Intervention (2nd ed.). M.E. Sharpe. ISBN 978-0-7656-3189-3.
- Caspersen, Nina (2010). Contested Nationalism: Serb Elite Rivalry in Croatia and Bosnia in the 1990s. Berghahn Books. ISBN 978-1-84545-791-4.
- Central Intelligence Agency (1993). Combatant Forces in the Former Yugoslavia (PDF). Washington, D.C.: Central Intelligence Agency. Archived (PDF) from the original on 14 October 2013.
- Central Intelligence Agency, Office of Russian and European Analysis (2002). Balkan Battlegrounds: A Military History of the Yugoslav Conflict, 1990–1995, Volume 1. Washington, D.C.: Central Intelligence Agency. ISBN 978-0-16-066472-4.
- Central Intelligence Agency, Office of Russian and European Analysis (2002). Balkan Battlegrounds: A Military History of the Yugoslav Conflict, 1990–1995, Volume 2. Washington, D.C.: Central Intelligence Agency. ISBN 978-0-16-066472-4.
- Christia, Fotini (2012). Alliance Formation in Civil Wars. Cambridge: Cambridge University Press. ISBN 978-1-13985-175-6.
- Donia, Robert J. (2006). Sarajevo: A Biography. University of Michigan Press. ISBN 978-0-472-11557-0.
- Finlan, Alastair (2004). The Collapse of Yugoslavia 1991–1999. Osprey Publishing. ISBN 9781841768052.
- Forsythe, David P. (2009). Encyclopedia of Human Rights. Vol. 1. Oxford University Press. ISBN 9780195334029.
- Hall, Richard C. ed. War in the Balkans: An Encyclopedic History from the Fall of the Ottoman Empire to the Breakup of Yugoslavia (2014)
- Gagnon, V.P. Jr. (2006). The Myth of Ethnic War: Serbia and Croatia in the 1990s. Ithaca, New York: Cornell University Press. ISBN 978-0-80147-291-6.
- Hammond, Philip (2007). Framing Post-Cold War Conflicts: The Media and International Intervention. Manchester: Manchester University Press. ISBN 978-0-7190-7696-1.
- Hoff, Lee Ann (2009). Violence and Abuse Issues: Cross-Cultural Perspectives for Health and Social Services. Routledge. ISBN 9780203875629.
- Logos, Aleksandar (2019). Istorija Srba 1, Dopuna 4; Istorija Srba 5 (PDF). ISBN 978-86-85117-46-6. Archived from the original on 19 May 2023.
- Lukic, Reneo; Lynch, Allen (1996). Europe from the Balkans to the Urals: The Disintegration of Yugoslavia and the Soviet Union. SIPRI, Oxford University Press. ISBN 9780198292005.
- Malcolm, Noel (1995). Povijest Bosne: kratki pregled [Bosnia: A Short History]. Erasmus Gilda. ISBN 9783895470820.
- Mulaj, Klejda (2008). Politics of Ethnic Cleansing: Nation-state Building and Provision of In/security in Twentieth-century Balkans. Lexington Books. ISBN 978-0-7391-1782-8.
- Nettelfield, Lara J. (2010a). Courting Democracy in Bosnia and Herzegovina: The Hague Tribunal's Impact in a Postwar State. Cambridge: Cambridge University Press. ISBN 978-0-521-76380-6.
- Phillips, R. Cody (2005). Bosnia-Herzegovina. Government Printing Office. ISBN 9780160876141.
- Ramet, Sabrina P. (2010). Central and Southeast European Politics since 1989. Cambridge University Press. ISBN 978-1-139-48750-4.
- Ramet, Sabrina P. (2006). The Three Yugoslavias: State-Building and Legitimation, 1918–2005. Bloomington, Indiana: Indiana University Press. ISBN 978-0-253-34656-8.
- Schindler, John R. (2007). Unholy Terror: Bosnia, Al-Qa'ida, and the Rise of Global Jihad. New York City: Zenith Press. ISBN 9780760330036.
- Seybolt, Taylor B. (2007). Humanitarian Military Intervention: The Conditions for Success and Failure. Oxford University Press. ISBN 9780199252435.
- Shrader, Charles R. (2003). The Muslim-Croat Civil War in Central Bosnia: A Military History, 1992–1994. College Station, Texas: Texas A&M University Press. ISBN 978-1-58544-261-4.
- Tanner, Marcus (2001). Croatia: A Nation Forged in War. New Haven: Yale University Press. ISBN 978-0-300-09125-0.
- Trbovich, Ana S. (2008). A Legal Geography of Yugoslavia's Disintegration. Oxford University Press, USA. ISBN 978-0-19-533343-5.
- Totten, Samuel (2017). Genocide at the Millennium. London: Routledge. ISBN 9781351517836.
- Wood, Elisabeth J. (2013). Miranda A.H Horvath, Jessica Woodhams (ed.). Handbook on the Study of Multiple Perpetrator Rape: A multidisciplinary response to an international problem. Routledge. ISBN 978-0-415-50044-9.

=== Journals ===
- Baker, Catherine. "Between the round table and the waiting room: Scholarship on war and peace in Bosnia-Herzegovina and Kosovo after the 'Post-Cold War'." Contemporary European History 28.1 (2019): 107–119. online Archived 10 June 2023 at the Wayback Machine
- Bell-Fialkoff, Andrew (1993). "A Brief History of Ethnic Cleansing". Foreign Affairs. 72 (3): 110–121. doi:10.2307/20045626. JSTOR 20045626. S2CID 27821821.
- Haddad, Heidi Nichols (2011). "Mobilizing the Will to Prosecute: Crimes of Rape at the Yugoslav and Rwandan Tribunals". Human Rights Review. 12: 109–132. doi:10.1007/s12142-010-0163-x. S2CID 55172255.
- Lučić, Ivo (June 2008). "Bosna i Hercegovina od prvih izbora do međunarodnog priznanja" [Bosnia and Herzegovina from the first elections to international recognition]. Review of Contemporary History. 40 (1). Zagreb, Croatia: Croatian Institute of History: 107–140.
- Krišto, Jure (April 2011). "Deconstructing a myth: Franjo Tuđman and Bosnia and Herzegovina". Review of Croatian History. 6 (1): 37–66. Archived from the original on 28 March 2020.
- Marijan, Davor (2004). "Expert Opinion: On the War Connections of Croatia and Bosnia and Herzegovina (1991–1995)". Journal of Contemporary History. 36: 249–289. Archived from the original on 2 January 2020.
- Meznaric, Silva; Zlatkovic Winter, Jelena (February 1993). "Forced Migration and Refugee Flows in Croatia, Slovenia and Bosnia-Herzegovina: Early Warning, Beginning and Current State of Flows". Refuge. 12 (7): 3–4. doi:10.25071/1920-7336.21183. Archived from the original on 31 December 2014.
- Sadkovich, James J. (January 2007). "Franjo Tuđman and the Muslim-Croat War of 1993". Review of Croatian History. 2 (1): 204–245. ISSN 1845-4380. Archived from the original on 17 March 2020.
- Tomas, Mario; Nazor, Ante (October 2013). "Prikaz i analiza borbi na bosanskoposavskom bojištu 1992" [Analysis of the Military Conflict on the Bosnian-Posavina Battlefront in 1992]. Scrinia Slavonica. 13 (1): 277–315. ISSN 1848-9109. Archived from the original on 16 January 2023.

=== Other sources ===
- Blagojević, V. (16 June 2011). "U Koridoru temelji Srpske" [Republika Srpska Foundation in the Corridor]. Večernje novosti (in Serbian). Archived from the original on 10 July 2019.
- Koknar, Ali M. (14 July 2003). "The Kontraktniki : Russian mercenaries at war in the Balkans". Bosnian Institute. Archived from the original on 4 March 2016.
- Vasić, Miloš (23 January 1999). "Politika falsifikata" [A forged policy]. Vreme (in Serbian). Archived from the original on 26 December 2002.
- "Appeals Chamber Judgement in the Case The Prosecutor v. Tihomir Blaškić" (PDF). International Criminal Tribunal for the former Yugoslavia. 29 July 2004. Archived (PDF) from the original on 20 August 2023.
- "Prosecutor v. Ćurić Enes, Demirović Ibrahim, Kreso Samir, Čopelja Habib and Kaminić Mehmed". The Court of Bosnia and Herzegovina. 2015. Archived from the original on 22 February 2022.
- "Judgement Summary for Rasim Delić" (PDF). International Criminal Tribunal for the former Yugoslavia. 15 September 2008. Archived (PDF) from the original on 7 April 2020.
- "Summary of the Judgement for Enver Hadžihasanović and Amir Kubura" (PDF). International Criminal Tribunal for the former Yugoslavia. 15 March 2006. Archived (PDF) from the original on 4 October 2018.
- "Judgement in the Case The Prosecutor v. Sefer Halilović" (PDF). International Criminal Tribunal for the former Yugoslavia. 16 November 2005. Archived (PDF) from the original on 4 October 2018.
- "Prosecutor v. Radovan Karadžić" (PDF). The Hague: International Criminal tribunal for the Former Yugoslavia. 24 March 2016. Archived (PDF) from the original on 11 October 2016.
- "Appeals Chamber Judgement in the Case The Prosecutor v. Dario Kordić and Mario Čerkez" (PDF). International Criminal Tribunal for the former Yugoslavia. 17 December 2004. Archived (PDF) from the original on 7 April 2020.
- "Appeals Chamber Judgement in the Case The Prosecutor v. Radislav Krstić" (PDF). International Criminal Tribunal for the former Yugoslavia. 19 April 2004. Archived (PDF) from the original on 20 August 2023.
- "Prosecutor v. Ratko Mladić" (PDF). The Hague: International Criminal tribunal for the Former Yugoslavia. 22 November 2017. Archived (PDF) from the original on 17 October 2026.
- "Summary of the Sentencing Judgement for Ivica Rajić" (PDF). International Criminal Tribunal for the former Yugoslavia. 8 May 2006. Archived (PDF) from the original on 20 August 2023.
- "Prosecutor v. Jadranko Prlić, Bruno Stojić, Slobodan Praljak, Milivoj Petković, Valentin Ćorić, Berislav Pušić – Judgement Summary" (PDF). International Criminal Tribunal for the former Yugoslavia. 29 May 2013. Archived (PDF) from the original on 5 March 2022.
