= Warriors (1999 TV series) =

- VHS cover
- Genre: War drama
- Written by: Leigh Jackson
- Directed by: Peter Kosminsky
- Starring: Matthew Macfadyen; Damian Lewis; Ioan Gruffudd; Cal Macaninch; Darren Morfitt; Shaun Dooley; Tom Ward
- Theme music composer: Debbie Wiseman
- Composer: Debbie Wiseman
- Country of origin: United Kingdom
- Original language: English
- No. of series: 1
- No. of episodes: 2

Production
- Executive producers: Gareth Neame; Jane Tranter
- Producer: Nigel Stafford-Clark
- Production location: Czech Republic
- Cinematography: Richard Greatrex
- Editor: Chris Risdale
- Running time: 90 minutes

Original release
- Network: BBC One
- Release: 20 November – 21 November 1999

Warriors is a two-part British television drama serial, written by Leigh Jackson, produced by Nigel Stafford-Clark and directed by Peter Kosminsky. It starred Matthew Macfadyen, Damian Lewis and Ioan Gruffudd. It aired on BBC One on 20 and 21 November 1999. The serial tells the story of a group of British peacekeepers serving in a peacekeeping operation of the UNPROFOR in Vitez, in Bosnia during the Lašva Valley ethnic cleansing in 1993. The serial was released on VHS on 29 November 1999. On 7 January 2004 the serial was issued on DVD in the Netherlands.

The film emphasises the contradictions of the mandate of the peacekeepers, and the psychological trauma that they sustain while being forced to observe atrocities perpetrated against civilians without being able to intervene, and being subject to deliberate provocations to which they are unable to respond. The ironic title of the programme is taken from the name of the armoured vehicle used by the British forces, the FV 510 Warrior. Music for the serial was written by Debbie Wiseman. When it aired in the United States, the serial was re-titled Peacekeepers.

== Plot ==
=== Episode one ===
In Liverpool, 1992, the soldiers are seen going about their lives, on leave after a recent tour in Northern Ireland. Sergeant Sochanik is struggling to cope with the recent death of his brother in an accident, whilst he was away. James and Skeet celebrate the 16th birthday of Skeet's younger sister, Sandra. In their base, Lieutenant Feeley is briefed that the battalion is to deploy to Yugoslavia for peacekeeping purposes. Lieutenant Loughry is informed by Major Stone over the phone, and is forced to postpone his forthcoming wedding, much to the anger of his fiancée, Emma. James and Skeet go out, eventually following a hen night to a local nightclub. After the pair befriend the girls, the groom appears, one of the girls admitting her dislike to James after the groom had previously attempted to grope her. The groom, spotting Skeet dancing with his fiancée, Cheryl, attempts to interject, only for James to drag him out effortlessly before warning him to not cause trouble. In the morning, Cheryl expresses her regret at not meeting Skeet sooner, before being dragged away by her friend to the wedding. When the pair get home, they find out that their leave has been cancelled, with James telling his grandmother, and Skeet telling his sister.

The unit are flown out to Yugoslavia, where they load into their white-painted Warriors. James serves as the gunner on Lieutenant Feeley's Warrior, Three-Zero, the lead of the convoy, while Skeet serves as its driver. Driving into Vitez, in the Lašva Valley, they note damage, as well as groups of soldiers, before briefly stopping to pass out sweets. At the base, a former school, they receive a briefing, where they are told their mission is to "make sure these people don't starve", and their mandate is that "we do not take sides, we don't move refugees, we don't start ethnic cleansing, we are not here to redraw the ethnic map of Bosnia", before being informed that their rules of engagement prevent shooting unless at direct risk themselves. Rik Langrubber, from the UNHCR, explains the situation, as James and Skeet discuss forthcoming football matches. While standing guard at night, two soldiers hear screaming, followed by a gunshot, seemingly able to witness whatever has just taken place yet unable to intervene.

The next day, the platoon go out to pick up an injured Muslim child, leaving the base with their new interpreter, Minka. Along their route, they are blocked by anti-tank mines at a checkpoint guarded by Croatian soldiers, who demand to be allowed to check the Warriors. They are eventually persuaded to let the Warriors through, who then roll through a damaged village. Upon arriving at the destination house, a small crowd of Croats has gathered outside, who refuse to enter because they believe the house to be occupied by Muslims. While talking to the residents, who have been informed they have 20 minutes to leave before the house is burnt down, the residents mention armed men visiting in the previous night and driving many locals away, with the small boy having jumped from a balcony to get away. Armed men in Croatian uniforms then show up, to fulfil their threats. Lieutenant Feeley attempts to convince them to leave the residents alone, but is unsuccessful, and the British soldiers evacuate the residents as the house is set alight. Langrubber arrives and admonishes Feeley for evacuating the civilians in the Warriors, stating that doing so is helping to ethnically cleanse the area and that the soldiers' job is merely to evacuate the child, with the British soldiers complying. The child is found, badly injured, in a drainage pipe along the river, and rescued by Skeet. As the Warriors return to base with the child, they come upon the same checkpoint, unguarded but with the mines replaced. Lieutenant Feeley jumps out and kicks the mines out of the way, the Warriors getting through before the soldiers can return to stop him. He is scolded for this by Captain Gurney, as Langruber is significantly delayed by the angered soldiers when trying to drive through later. Lieutenant Loughrey and Minka chat, whilst Skeet watches over the resting child. He is visited by Lieutenant Feeley, who notes a small matchbox the child is clutching, and carefully pries a note out of it, which contains a phone number. Minka calls the phone number, finding it to be the boy's mother, enabling them to be reunited.

Lieutenant Feeley and Lieutenant Loughrey share a civilian house, and are invited to Christmas dinner by the neighbours. The platoon is sent to observe a crossing guarded by Serbian forces, where between 6 and 7 thousand refugees are trying to make their way across. When they arrive, soldiers are stripping random civilians of any valuable items, and randomly firing shots into the air to intimidate the civilians. One soldier strips a woman of more and more clothing, before James intervenes and guides her away. At this, the rest of the platoon takes a more active role, preventing the soldiers from looting the civilians and aiding the civilians in carrying burdens, in contravention of their orders. Langrubber arrives, but does not attempt to stop the platoon. Afterwards, during a Christmas phone call, Emma mentions that she is experiencing morning sickness. Minka is visibly distressed when told of this. The platoon puts on a Christmas party, inviting several local children.

Lieutenant Feeley and Lieutenant Loughrey prepare to visit the neighbours for dinner, but Feeley tells Loughrey that since Muslims don't drink, they cannot take wine, leading them to instead bring bananas. Loughrey is called back to base, leaving Feeley to meet the neighbours alone, but the husband is delayed by work, as he works at an explosives factory. The neighbours' daughter, Hajra, is upstairs, playing music. Feeley is embarrassed to realise his mistake when offered a drink by the wife, Almira, which he accepts, drinking whisky along with the husband, Naser. Naser was a Harvard graduate, and together with Almira share their thoughts with Feeley about the situation. Almira expresses her belief that the valley is cursed, something Naser does not believe.

During the next patrol, the Warriors drive through an active warzone, with burning vehicles and dead bodies strewn around. One appears to have been shot while walking with groceries. James attempts to dismiss the situation with humour, as they pass several soldiers engaged in a gun battle. A report comes in of a pregnant woman needing an ambulance, so Three-Zero takes the job, turning back. Soldiers run past as they move, using Three-Zero for cover. The vehicle jerks to a sudden stop as Hookway brews tea inside the passenger compartment with the boiling vessel, scalding himself. Initially, the crew are unsure why Three-Zero stopped so abruptly, until James realises Skeet is not responding, and attempts to investigate by crawling through the narrow confines of the Warrior, finding Skeet has been hit by a sniper. The rest of Three-Zero are able to extract Skeet from his seat as a gun battle rages around them, but he is seemingly already dead by the time reinforcements arrive. James grieves the loss of his best friend, visiting him in the morgue, as Feeley blames himself. When he tells the rest of the platoon, one soldier requests they be allowed to attack the building where the shot came from in revenge, but is told not to. James makes the call to inform Sandra, stating he wishes it had been him that had died. Later that night, Feeley finds James standing at the fence with his rifle, looking for snipers to shoot at, or more likely, in hopes of being shot himself. Feeley talks him down, before asking James for his suggestions for a new driver, with James suggesting Hookway.

On the next patrol, the unit is held overnight at a bridge by Serbian forces, who refuse to let them cross to aid 25,000 civilians currently under fire. Langrubber attempts to negotiate access, with Loughrey stating his belief that the method is flawed and they should be permitted to fight their way through. Langrubber's negotiations result in the Serbians demanding to check IDs of the soldiers, with Sochanik being held up due to his Polish surname. The soldier asks why Sochanik wishes to save "dirty Muslims", to which Sochanik responds that he is just doing his job. In the morning, they are allowed to cross, but only with two Land Rovers, a single Warrior, and one truck, in order to save the most seriously wounded over the course of 12 hours. Driving over the bridge and towards the civilians, they pass multiple tanks, who have paused their fire due to the UN presence. Upon arriving in the town, they are swarmed by civilians, who reject the British attempts to only evacuate the wounded. Civilians crowd around the vehicles to block their exit, hoping that the UN presence in the town will keep the Serbian forces from attacking. Langrubber gets away, returning to once again negotiate. Sochanik reveals to Aida, the interpreter accompanying them, that his mother is in fact Serbian, and that he speaks the language, his parents having met after his Polish father was sent as forced labour to build a concentration camp in the area. The next morning, while James is shaving in an exaggerated manner for the amusement of several children, the Serbs resume their bombardment, killing many and causing immense panic, while claiming to the UN forces still held at the bridge that the Muslims are instead shelling themselves. Captain Gurney orders all remaining troops back on board the Warriors so that they can withdraw, whilst James and Sochanik are occupied helping wounded civilians. When they do not reboard, Gurney orders his driver to exit the area at speed, abandoning James, Sochanik, and Loughrey, along with other soldiers, much to the protests of Corporal Sprague. Their Warrior is then stopped by a human barricade of civilians, who Gurney attempts to convince that evacuation is the only option for the civilians. Their commander relents, stating that she will attempt to reach Srebrenica, their ultimate fate uncertain, with Gurney visibly distressed by what he has been forced to do. James rescues a young wounded civilian, ushering him into the back of the Warrior. While attending to his wounds in the back of the cramped Warrior, they note his Manchester United shirt, briefly laughing about it, with James dubbing the boy Giggsy in reference to his shirt. The Warrior is blocked by a T-34 on the road, leading a column of armour and surrounded by Serbian infantry. Gurney meets the column leader, the same officer who had held them at the bridge and attempted to blame the Muslims for the shelling. The officer demands to search their Warrior before they will be allowed past, which Gurney strongly rejects, only for Langrubber to arrive and order him to submit to the search. When informed that the Serbs intend to search the Warrior, the soldiers inside dress Giggsy in their uniforms, but the visible wounds and his demeanour give him away when the Serbs look into the back of the vehicle. They demand that Giggsy be handed over as a prisoner of war, which James refuses, eventually being convinced to by Gurney and Lieutenant Feeley. The soldiers take Giggsy into the woods to be killed, whilst James cries in the Warrior.

=== Episode two ===
Lieutenant Feeley visits Almira again, stating his belief that the valley is indeed cursed. She guides him to the site of a WW2 concentration camp. On a patrol, Lieutenant Loughrey visits Ahmići, and is invited in by a local Bosnian with a large family. Sprague plays on a NES with the children, whilst Loughrey explains to the man that they are not here to fight the Serbs, but instead to distribute aid. Lieutenant Engel walks over to the Croatian side of Ahmići, but finds no one willing to show themselves. While stopping at fresh roadside graves, Almira tells Feeley that Naser will not leave the area no matter how bad it gets, as he is too proud. Cars bearing Croatian flags then drive past, with groups of soldiers getting out and terrorising two elderly civilians, in full view of Feeley. They execute the civilians' dog, then begin looting, Feeley instructing Almira to drive off if anything happens before retrieving his rifle and going to intervene. Almira disobeys, acting as an interpreter for Feeley to the Croatian commander, who claims the civilians are being moved for their own safety. Feeley asks if Dario Kordić authorised this mission, with the commander refusing to give an answer and instead immediately abandoning the looting, evidently angered. It is night-time when Loughrey and his unit leave the house, with Loughrey noting the presence of crosses on nearby houses, but he is unsure of their meaning.

The next day, Feeley takes James and another Warrior to visit the elderly couple, finding that the man has been crucified upon his house and the woman lies dead next to her still-unburied dog, implying that the Croat forces returned as soon as Feeley left. James attempts to cut the man down, but is warned not to by Sochanik, who suggests that the body may have been booby-trapped. Continuing the patrol, they are informed by radio of heavy fighting in Ahmići, and go to investigate. They find sheer carnage, with HVO graffiti everywhere and burning buildings. James watches as a puppy, previously cradled by its deceased owner, attempts to wake its owner up. Lieutenant Engel helps a wounded girl, the only survivor seen. Loughrey investigates the house he spent the previous day in, finding its inhabitants charred to skeletons after being burnt alive in the basement. Sprague comes across the remains of the child he had been playing NES with. Loughrey then notes that the houses with crosses painted onto them have been saved, and spots movement at the windows. He attempts to force his way in, angered that the residents sat and watched while their neighbours were burnt alive, before suffering a breakdown in front of his unit. He struggles to talk to Emma over the phone afterwards, as she tries to discuss mundane things, and is unable to understand his euphemisms for the horrible work they do. In the mess hall, James destroys his plate after being served food, angering the staff. A unit football match refereed by Minka turns violent, the soldiers agitated by what they have seen. Almira visits Feeley, reporting that her husband claims the worst has passed, yet she does not believe him. Feeley offers for a protection detail to be set up, but she rejects it, claiming that things have gone too far. While Feeley sits at home, Loughrey returns, accompanied by Minka, with Loughrey claiming she is present just for a drink. Feeley obviously does not believe this, and when Minka leaves the following morning, he accosts Loughrey, asking him what he is doing when Emma is pregnant back home. Loughrey retorts by asking what Feeley is doing meeting Almira so often. Naser is seen driving away with a rifle, having had an argument with Almira. Feeley and Loughrey are ordered to move back to the base for their own safety, with Feeley informing Almira, who says they are preparing to move away in turn. Upon their return to base, Feeley and Loughrey are informed that the Croat forces are making a land grab, with fighting in Vitez, meaning that the UN forces are to enact round-the-clock patrolling. Major Stone states that the soldiers are not to feel guilty for what happened in Ahmići, as they cannot be everywhere.

During the next patrol, the UN forces see armed men methodically advancing down streets in Vitez, busting in windows, throwing explosives and firing machine guns inside. The British soldiers encounter dozens of civilians crowded into a small building, and begin evacuating them, with Feeley stating his desire not to return to put them in body bags. Captain Gurney orders them to stop via radio, stating that they cannot move civilians unless they are injured, with Loughrey retorting that they will be if not moved. Major Stone then takes over the radio, and reiterates this, adding that the Colonel has ordered the evacuation to halt. The British soldiers are forced to comply, angering the soldiers and confusing the civilians, one of whom forces her baby upon Sprague and flees before he can return it. Loughrey is dressed down by Major Stone, who argues that evacuating civilians endorses the ethnic cleansing, and that they cannot know if the civilians have actually suffered harm. Feeley returns to Almira, and has her and Hajra pack bags for several days whilst artillery explodes in the background, bringing them to the military base. Almira informs him that Naser has gone to fight, explaining his sudden belief that Almira should flee, and that Naser suggested she flee to Hungary.

At night, the unit deploys after hearing reports of explosions near tower blocks in Vitez. They arrive to find buildings burning, and civilians sheltering in a basement. When James informs Lieutenant Feeley that Langrubber is on his way, Feeley orders Lieutenant Engel to keep him occupied, having Loughrey conduct a foot patrol as he turns all the radios off. The civilians are thus evacuated to Travnik via the empty Warriors, amidst sniper fire. Almira and Hajra return home, intending to pack their remaining items and head for Hungary. In the morning, the unit discuss the possible consequences of what they have done, with Sochanik stating his intent to quit as soon as this deployment ends. While returning to base, Feeley notices smoke coming from Almira's house, and has the unit investigate, finding the bodies of Almira and Hajra, with it implied they were sexually assaulted by their attackers before being executed. Captain Gurney congratulates Feeley for what was done the previous night, before Feeley is informed of Almira and Hajra's death. A grave is prepared, and an Imam, previously seen being evacuated from Vitez, is brought in, who performs a funeral ceremony. Feeley collects some items, including a photo, to keep as a reminder of Almira.

The unit sees a news report about peace negotiations, as Lieutenant Loughrey is informed that the Muslims and Croats intend to swap bodies, and request their presence to conduct the swap. The Muslims return four bodies wrapped in body bags, but the Croats complain, stating that there should be a fifth, an abducted officer. Loughrey asks Lieutenant Engel how many bodies are in the Croat truck, and is informed they possess 98. The Croats additionally bring a truckload of female civilians, and their commander tells Engel of a house in which he has Muslim men and boys chained up: if the officer is not returned, the house will be dynamited, and the women will be given to his men to be sexually assaulted. When Engel warns the commander that doing so will result in him being indicted as a war criminal, and that Engel will testify against him, he is informed by an English-speaking Croat that one of the bodies in the truck is still alive. James is forced to clamber into the truck in order to retrieve the wounded man. A thick black sludge is dripping from the truck, with flies buzzing around, but the contents of the truck, which cause James to retch, are otherwise not shown. He retrieves the man, revealed to be Naser. Croats circle the pair, stabbing Naser with bayonets, before Loughrey and Engel arrive to rescue him, with Loughrey quickly recognising Naser. James returns to the Croat commander, taking out his anger with a flurry of insults, culminating in him showing his penis to the commander and suggesting the commander to be a eunuch, hoping to provoke the commander such that James may be able to kill him. The Croat then receives orders from his commanders, telling him to turn over the bodies.

The scene then cuts to Engel being interviewed for a war crimes tribunal against the commander whilst back in England, with the lawyer asking if Engel believes James to have overstepped. Engel responds that while James went beyond the mandate, he was still doing the right thing, adding that James was reprimanded for providing morphine to Naser. Engel is unable to provide a name to the tribunal, effectively rendering his testimony useless. In a voiceover over a flashback of the unit burying the Muslim bodies in a mass grave, their faces masked to protect against the smell, Engel describes how the 98 bodies were returned mutilated whilst complaining about the Muslim side killing four. Engel states that even the children's bodies were dismembered, before derisively snorting when the lawyer mentions he received a medal for his efforts.

Back in Yugoslavia, Lieutenant Feeley wanders through the school, looking for the wounded Naser amidst crowds of refugees. He eventually finds Naser, whose left foot has been amputated, though he is in better condition than many of the civilians in the hospital. Feeley brings Naser a bottle of whiskey, and the two discuss Almira and her death. Naser tells Feeley that he had left her on bad terms, and that she no longer loved him. Feeley gives Naser the photo, causing Naser to cry.

The unit is sent back home after a small ceremony, with Lieutenant Loughrey kissing Minka goodbye. Each struggles to re-adjust to civilian life. James, at a supermarket, tells a small child that is crying due to their mother not being able to afford a toy that they should be grateful to still have their arms and legs, causing a scene that his grandmother has to take him away from. He struggles to enjoy watching football matches with Sandra, and has difficulty reconnecting with her. Skeet's father tells James that he did a great job, that they were heroes, and that people are proud of them. James rejects this, telling both the father and Sandra that they left people to die, before smashing up a bus stop in anger. Loughry experiences a PTSD flashback while mowing the garden, destroying part of it: when the heavily pregnant Emma attempts to stop him, he hits her. She is hospitalised with a dislocated jaw, and police talk to him about the incident, where he states that she is not his wife, just his girlfriend. The experience causes her to deliver the baby, a boy, who the heavily injured Emma allows him to pick up. He cries while holding the child.

James is interviewed by the same lawyer who interviewed Lieutenant Engel, and upon leaving bumps into Lieutenant Feeley, who requests that his interview be rescheduled so the two can catch up. At a cafe, James describes to Feeley a recurring dream of walking on dead bodies, and how he can no longer defrost chicken as the smell and feel reminds him of his experience. Feeley then goes to visit Loughrey and Emma, who has healed somewhat but is still visibly injured. When he asks what happened to her face, she deflects, stating that Loughrey is not present before offering him tea. She informs Feeley that Loughrey kept a diary, before throwing it at him and asking about Minka. He replies that Loughrey and Minka got very close, before adding that Minka has died after her Land Rover hit a mine. Emma tells Feeley that Loughrey has become a different person, one whom she does not recognise, and that she read the diary in the hope it would explain what happened. Feeley later meets Loughrey in a pub, telling him the same, adding that she died with a young Dutch officer, before having to re-assure Loughrey that the pair were on work duties. Loughrey claims he only loves Emma, and says he feels guilty for coming back. As the two leave, Feeley informs Loughrey that he has been sent back to Northern Ireland, claiming to be ready for it. Sochanik is shown back on his family farm, driving a tractor, only for Sprague to visit. The two chat about the rest of the unit, with Sochanik mentioning that Engel attended Loughrey's wedding, and that Feeley has been promoted to captain. Sprague tells Sochanik he is going back to Bosnia to drive trucks for aid agencies, considering it unfinished business.

In the barracks in Northern Ireland, Feeley hears another soldier claim that Bosnia was a doddle compared to Northern Ireland, before claiming not to remember when asked what he believes to be worse. He sits alone in his room late at night, before fetching a pistol and ammunition from the armoury. Sitting on the bed, scenes from his time in Yugoslavia flash before him, as he puts the pistol to his head, only being stopped by the sudden arrival of two of his fellow soldiers who hug him as he cries.

== Cast ==
- Ioan Gruffudd as Lieutenant John Feeley
- Matthew Macfadyen as Private Alan James
- Damian Lewis as Lieutenant Neil Loughrey
- Cal Macaninch as Sergeant Andre Sochanik
- Darren Morfitt as Private Peter Skeet
- Shaun Dooley as Private John Hookway
- Tom Ward as Captain Richard Gurney
- Joe Renton as Corporal Gary Sprague
- Ifan Meredith as Lieutenant Jonathan Engel
- Simon Shepherd as Major 'Brick' Stone
- Steve Chaplin as Private Tommy Redmond
- Greg Chisholm as Private Martin Rook
- Jodhi May as Emma
- Predrag Bjelac as Naser Zec
- Branka Katić as Almira Zec
- Nives Frenjo as Hajra Zec
- Carsten Voigt as Rik Langrubber
- Sheyla Shehovich as Minka
- Jasmina Sijercic as Aida
- Elizabeth Lovelady as Sandra Skeet
- Zaim Muzaferija as Imam
- Pauline Yates as Gran
- Vincent Maguire as Mr Skeet
- Eithne Brown as Gloria Skeet
- Tony Broughton as Old Sochanik
- Deirdre Doon as Mrs Sochanik
- Joanne Reilly as Judy
- Ian Pain as Company Sergeant Major
- Fiona Mollison as Mrs Loughrey
- Linzi Matthews as Cheryl
- Suzanne Maddock as June

== Awards ==
- British Academy Television Awards
  - Best Drama Serial
  - Best Sound
  - Best Design (nominated)
  - Best Photography and Lighting (nominated)
- Biarritz International Festival of Audiovisual Programming, Golden FIPA
- Broadcasting Press Guild Awards, Broadcasting Press Guild Award, Best Single Drama
- Monte-Carlo TV Festival, Golden Nymph, Mini-Series - Best Mini-Series
- Prix Italia, Fiction, 2000
- Royal Television Society Awards
  - Best Single Drama
  - Actor: Male - Matthew Macfadyen (nominated)
  - Best Team (nominated)
  - Best Writing - Leigh Jackson (nominated)
- Royal Television Society Craft & Design Awards
  - Best Costume Design - Drama - James Keast
  - Best Make Up Design - Drama - Ann Oldham (nominated)
  - Best Music – Original Score - Debbie Wiseman
  - Best Production Design – Drama - Phil Roberson (nominated)
  - Best Sound – Drama - Maurice Hillier, Danny Longhurst, Graham Headicar, David Old
