= Nadioci =

Village in Vitez, Bosnia and Herzegovina

- Village
- Location within Bosnia and Herzegovina
- Coordinates: 44.1399°N 17.8476°E
- Country: Bosnia and Herzegovina
- Entity: Federation of Bosnia and Herzegovina
- Canton: Central Bosnia
- Municipality: Vitez

Area
  - Total: 0.80 sq mi (2.07 km^{2})

Population (2013)
  - Total: 332
  - Density: 415/sq mi (160/km^{2})
- Time zone: UTC+1 (CET)
  - Summer (DST): UTC+2 (CEST)

Nadioci is a village in the municipality of Vitez, Bosnia and Herzegovina.

== Demographics ==
According to the 2013 population census in Bosnia and Herzegovina, the population of Nadioci was 332. Over the period from 1991 to 2013, the village experienced a modest annual population decline of approximately 1.6%. The gender distribution was relatively balanced, with males making up 53% (176 individuals) and females 47% (156 individuals) of the population.

The age structure indicated a predominantly working-age population, with 72.6% (241 individuals) between the ages of 15 and 64. Children aged 0–14 accounted for 14.8% (49 individuals), while 12.7% (42 individuals) were aged 65 and over, reflecting a somewhat aging demographic profile.

In terms of ethnic composition, the village was overwhelmingly inhabited by Croats, who comprised 95.5% (316 individuals) of the population. Bosniaks made up 3.3% (11 individuals), Serbs 0.9% (3 individuals), and 0.3% (1 individual) identified with other ethnic groups.

Ethnicity in 2013
Ethnicity	Number	Percentage
Croats	316	95.2%
Bosniaks	11	3.3%
Serbs	3	0.9%
other/undeclared	2	0.6%
Total	332	100%

== History ==
Nadioci is situated in the Lašva Valley, near the village Ahmići, a location that gained international attention due to the Ahmići massacre in April 1993, which was part of the Lašva Valley ethnic cleansing. Three families from Nadioci attempted to flee the conflict by tractor, but were intercepted by Miroslav Bralo and his group. These individuals were tragically killed, with the victims including eight children aged between 3 and 14 years old.

== Cultural heritage ==
In Nadioci, the local cultural and artistic society HKUD "Topala" organizes an annual folklore evening, which includes a cultural and entertainment program.
