= Azra Bašić =

Croatian camp guard

- Born: Azra Alešević; 22 June 1959 (age 67); Rijeka, PR Croatia, FPR Yugoslavia
- Other names: Azra Kovačević; Issabell Bašić
- Occupation: Camp guard
- Known for: Torture, murder and crimes against humanity
- Spouse: Nedžad Bašić (m. 1994; div. 2005)

Azra Bašić (née Alešević; born 22 June 1959) is a Bosniak former camp guard during the Bosnian War. While working in a detention camp near the majority Serb settlements of Čardak near Derventa, Bašić beat, tortured and subjected Serb civilian prisoners to particular cruelty and killed one prisoner by stabbing him in the neck. Bašić came to the U.S. in 1994 but was eventually extradited to Bosnia and Herzegovina in 2011. In 2017, she was found guilty of crimes against the detainees and sentenced to 14 years in prison.

== Profile ==
Azra Alešević was born on 22 June 1959 in Rijeka, Croatia, Yugoslavia. During the war, she fought with the Bosnian Croat (HVO) army. From April 1992 to August 1992, she worked as a guard in three detention camps near the majority Serb settlements of Čardak near Derventa. Bosnian state prosecutors charged her with torturing and murdering Serb civilian prisoners at the camps from April to June 1992.

According to court documents, she married Nedžad Bašić on 1 March 1994, in Bosnia and Herzegovina. She went by her maiden and married names, as well as the names Azra Kovačević and Issabell Bašić. She came to the United States as a refugee in 1994, eventually settling in Kentucky and becoming a naturalized citizen. She took jobs bathing elderly nursing home patients and worked at a Nestlé food plant in the small rural town of Mount Sterling, where locals knew her as "Issabella".

Bašić was charged in 1993, but was not located by Interpol until 2004. The Bosnian government issued a formal extradition request to the United States in 2007. The U.S. government requested more evidence, which the prosecutors provided in February and April 2010, before arresting her in 2011. She was prosecuted for immigration fraud before being extradited to Bosnia and Herzegovina to stand trial in 2016.

== Crimes ==
According to testimonies, on April 26, 1992, Croat groups, with the assistance of Croatian military units, entered the village of Čardak and took dozens of local Serbs hostage. Although the settlement was majority Serb, Croat and Muslims had previously formed joint units and threatened to kill and expel the Serb population. Many were taken to a former Yugoslavian National Army (YNA) Centre.

Prisoners at the facility were subjected to torture and beatings. A witness testified that Bašić brought a Croatian flag with a checkerboard coat of arms and ordered prisoners to kiss it and made them eat Yugoslav dinar paper money. She engraved a cross and the letter ‘S’ on prisoners' backs and foreheads with knives, put salt on their wounds and forced them to lick it. She also punched detainees in their genitals and threatened to circumcise them. One witness said Bašić forced him to drink gasoline and then set his face and hands on fire. Others described how they were made to crawl half naked across broken glass with a knotted rope in their mouths and a Croatian soldier on their backs. In one instance, a prisoner was severely beaten into unconsciousness. It was found that Bašić then killed that same prisoner by stabbing him in the neck and made others drink his blood. Bašić earned the nicknames "Azra Two Knives" as she always had twin knives strapped to her belt and a boot and "Bloody Azra" for the cruelty of the crimes. She was known as the "mistress of life and death".

On 27 December 2017, a Bosnian court sentenced her to 14 years in prison for taking part in "killing and inhumane treatment, infliction of great pain and violation of bodily integrity and health" of detained civilians. It included those who were held at the Yugoslav People's Army Hall in Derventa as well as the nearby village of Polje from April to May 1992. It is the longest sentence handed down to a woman convicted of war crimes during the Bosnian War.
