= Čardak =

The name Čardak might refer to various settlements in the former Yugoslavia:

Bosnia and Herzegovina

- Čardak (Modriča), a village close to Modriča
- Čardak, Zavidovići, a village close to Zavidovići

Montenegro

- Čardak, Pljevlja, a village near Pljevlja

Serbia

- Čardak, Sremska Kamenica, a neighborhood of Sremska Kamenica, Serbia
- Čardak, Kovin, a former vacation settlement and refugee camp in Serbia

Slovenia

- Čardak, Črnomelj, a settlement in Črnomelj Municipality, Slovenia

== See also ==
- Çardak (disambiguation)
- Chardak
