= Washington Agreement =

Treaty ending the Croat–Bosniak War

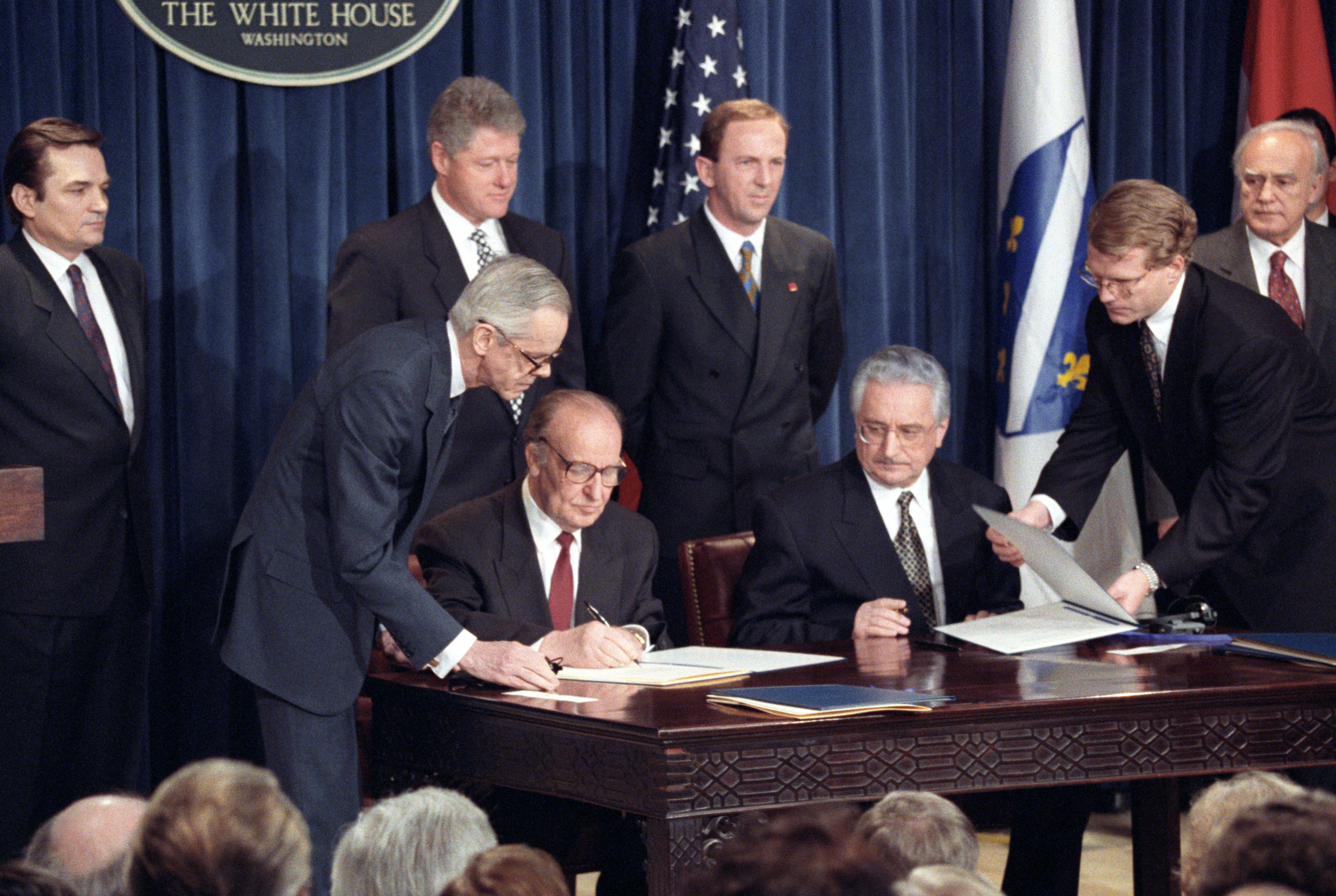
- Bosnian President Alija Izetbegović and Croatian President Franjo Tuđman sign the Washington Agreement
- Type: Ceasefire agreement
- Signed: 18 March 1994
- Location: Washington, D.C., United States Vienna, Austria
- Sealed: 24 March 1994
- Effective: 30 March 1994
- Signatories: (Republic of Bosnia and Herzegovina) Alija Izetbegović; (Republic of Bosnia and Herzegovina) Haris Silajdžić; (Croatia) Franjo Tuđman; (Croatia) Mate Granić; (Croatian Republic of Herzeg-Bosnia) Krešimir Zubak
- Parties: Bosnia and Herzegovina; Herzeg-Bosnia; Croatia Witnessed by: United States
- Ratifiers: Parliament of the Federation of Bosnia and Herzegovina
- Languages: Bosnian; Croatian

The Washington Agreement (Croatian: washingtonski sporazum; Bosnian: vašingtonski sporazum) was a ceasefire agreement between the Republic of Bosnia and Herzegovina and the Croatian Republic of Herzeg-Bosnia, signed on 18 March 1994 in Washington, D.C. It was signed by Bosnian Prime Minister Haris Silajdžić, Croatian Foreign Minister Mate Granić and President of Herzeg-Bosnia Krešimir Zubak.

Under the agreement, the combined territory held by the Croat and Bosnian (in that time Bosniak) government forces was divided into ten autonomous cantons, establishing the Federation of Bosnia and Herzegovina and ending the Croat-Bosniak War. The cantonal system was selected to prevent dominance by one ethnic group over another.

The subsequently signed Split Agreement resulted in the creation of a loose confederation between Croatia and Federation of Bosnia and Herzegovina as one of its goals.

== Background ==
The Croat–Bosniak War was a conflict between the Croatian Republic of Herzeg-Bosnia, supported by Croatia, on the one hand, and the Republic of Bosnia and Herzegovina on the other. It lasted from 18 October 1992 to 23 February 1994, and is considered often as a "war within a war" as it was a part of the much larger Bosnian War. Between 1992 and 1994, many massacres and killings would take place, such as the Lašva Valley ethnic cleansing, Trusina massacre, Ahmići massacre, Sovići and Doljani killings, Vitez massacre, Mokronoge massacre, Grabovica massacre, Uzdol massacre, Stupni Do massacre, Križančevo selo killings, Zenica massacre, Gornji Vakuf shelling, Busovača massacre, and the Stari Vitez terrorist attack. Battles, operations, and sieges were also common during that time period, as the battle of Žepče, Bugojno, Siege of Mostar, Operation Neretva '93, and Operation Tvigi 94.

== See also ==
- Federation of Bosnia and Herzegovina
- Croatian Republic of Herzeg-Bosnia
- Croat-Bosniak War
- Bosnian War
- Split Agreement
- Dayton Agreement
