= Tihomir Blaškić =

Bosnian Croat war criminal

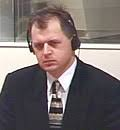
- Born: 2 November 1960 (age 65) Kiseljak, PR Bosnia and Herzegovina, FPR Yugoslavia
- Allegiance: Yugoslavia (1983–1991); Herzeg-Bosnia (1992–1996)
- Branch: Croatian Defence Council
- Rank: Major general (HVO)
- Commands: Operative Zone Central Bosnia; Vitez Command District
- Conflicts: Bosnian War: Operation Vrbas '92; Croat–Bosniak War; Battle of Travnik (1993); Operation Winter '94; Battle of Kupres (1994)

Tihomir Blaškić (born 2 November 1960) is a retired general and convicted war criminal of the Croatian Defence Council (HVO), who served during the Bosnian War and the Croat–Bosniak War. The International Criminal Tribunal for the Former Yugoslavia (ICTY) indicted him on war crimes charges and in 2000 he was sentenced to 45 years of prison. In July 2004, the ICTY, on appeal, determined that his command responsibility for most of the charges was non-existent and his sentence was lessened to nine years imprisonment. He was released the following month.

== Early life ==
Tihomir Blaškić was born on 2 November 1960 in the village of Brestovsko in the Kiseljak municipality of Bosnia-Herzegovina, FPR Yugoslavia. He was a career military officer and graduated from the Belgrade Military Academy in 1983, having previously been a captain in the Yugoslav People's Army (JNA).

During the period referred to in the indictment, he held the rank of colonel in the Croatian Defence Council (HVO), the official military formation of the Croatian Republic of Herzeg-Bosnia. From 27 June 1992, Blaškić was Commander of the Regional Headquarters of the Armed Forces in central Bosnia. Subsequently, in August 1994, he was promoted to the rank of general and appointed Commander of the HVO, which had its headquarters in Mostar. In November 1995, he was given the post of inspector in the General Inspectorate of the Army of the Republic of Croatia.

== Bosnian War ==
Following international recognition of Bosnia on 6 April 1992, armed conflict erupted between the different communities. As a result, on 8 April 1992, the Bosnian Croats created the HVO, backed by the Croatian Army (HV). The zones which they had control over were contained within the Croatian Community of Bosnia-Herzegovina (HZBH). Blaškić was in command of the HVO troops in the Lašva Valley in central Bosnia, which was inhabited, in the majority, by Muslims and Croats. Between May 1992 and January 1993, relations between the two communities became increasingly strained.

This peace plan gave definition to a decentralised Bosnia-Herzegovina, organised into ten provinces, each benefiting from substantial autonomy and each being administered by a democratically elected local government. Under this plan, the Lašva Valley was attached, for the greater part, to a province where the principal responsibilities were attributed to the Croats. Muslims wanted Croatian territories as satisfaction for territories lost from Serbs. The Croats are expelled from Travnik, Bugojno, Kakanj, Vareš, Konjic, Fojnica etc.

== War crimes ==
In 1996 the International Criminal Tribunal for the Former Yugoslavia (ICTY) indicted Blaškić for crimes committed by troops under his command against Bosniaks in central Bosnia, particularly the Lašva Valley, including grave breaches of the Geneva Conventions, violations of the laws or customs of war and crimes against humanity.

In reaction, Franjo Tuđman named Blaškić Inspector General of the Croatian Army. Later in the year, Blaškić was told by his military superiors that it was his duty to voluntarily surrender and he reluctantly did so; his trial began in 1997.

On 3 March 2000, The First Trial Chamber of the ICTY handed down its verdict, which condemned Blaškić to 45 years in prison. The First Trial Chamber charged Blaškić, based on his individual personal responsibility (Art. 7 § 1 ICTY Statute) and on his responsibility as hierarchical superior (Art. 7 § 3 ICTY Statute), on the following counts:

- serious breaches of the Geneva Conventions of 1949 (Art. 2 ICTY Statute: wilful murder, wilfully causing great suffering or serious injury to body or health; widespread destruction of property; inhumane treatment, taking of civilian hostages);
- violations of the laws and customs of war (Art. 3 ICTY Statute: devastation not justified by military necessity; illegal attacks on civilians; illegal attacks on civilian property, murder; infliction of grievous bodily harm; looting of public or private property; destruction or wilful damage to institutions dedicated to religion or education; cruel treatment; hostage taking;
- crimes against humanity (Art. 5 ICTY Statutes: persecutions on political, racial or religious grounds; murder; inhumane acts).

The case was in appeal until July 2004 when the ICTY appeals panel dismissed 16 of 19 counts in the initial indictment, notably the claim that Blaškić had command responsibility for the massacre in Ahmići and that Ahmići was not a legitimate military target. The decision did not assess the nature of Croat-Muslim war in Bosnia in 1993–94; it accepted the defense claim that there existed a "double chain of command". The appeals panel reaffirmed less serious charges, including responsibility for the inhumane treatment of POWs. It reduced Blaškić's prison sentence to nine years, purportedly due to his good behavior, clear prior record, poor health, voluntary surrender and his young children.

His defence applied for an early release as he had served eight years and four months already; the request was granted on 29 July 2004

Exactly one year later, ICTY prosecutor Carla Del Ponte filed a motion for new trial, citing new evidence. The Appeals Chamber dismissed this motion on 23 November 2006.

== See also ==
- Dario Kordić
