= List of vice presidents of the Croatian Republic of Herzeg-Bosnia =

This is a list of vice presidents of the Croatian Republic of Herzeg-Bosnia, an unrecognized state.

Below is a list of office-holders:

Name	Entered office	Left office	Party
Dario Kordić; Božo Rajić	1992	1994	HDZ BiH; HSS BiH

== Sources ==
- Eastern Europe and the Commonwealth of Independent States 1993
