= 110th HVO Usora Brigade =

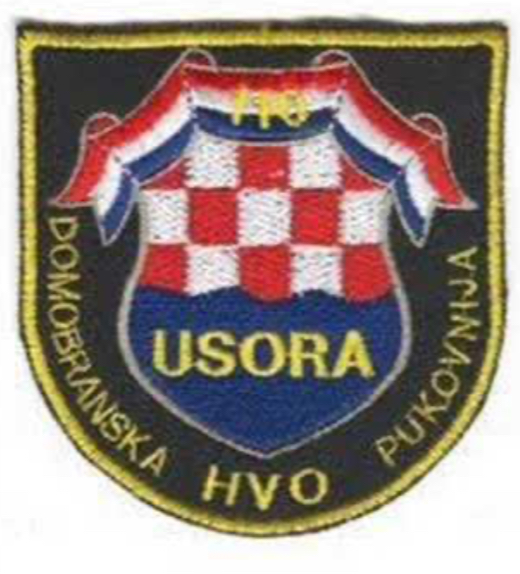
- Active: 1992 - 1995
- Country: (Croatian Republic of Herzeg-Bosnia) Herzeg-Bosnia
- Branch: Croatian Defence Council
- Type: Army
- Garrison/HQ: Tešanj
- Nickname(s): Titans
- Engagements: Bosnian War; Operation Corridor 92; Battle of Putnikovo brdo

Commanders
- Notable commanders: Nikola “Kava” (Coffee) Antunović

The 110th Usora Brigade was a unit of the Croatian Defense Council (HVO). It was one of the most elite brigades of the (HVO). The unit saw fierce against the Army of Republika Srpska near the Doboj area. The brigade was disbanded in 1995 following the signing of the Dayton Agreement, which ended the Bosnian War.

== Service ==
=== 1992 encirclement of Usora ===
The 110th Usorska Brigade’s area of responsibility had been encircled by the VRS. By May 1992, Doboj had been occupied by the Army of Republika Srpska; despite this, the 110th managed to rack up a number of victories. This culminated in the 110th fighting on other Bosnian battlefronts. These victories pushed the Serbs back into their positions. The 110th also managed to defend Komin, Sima baščan and Ušće. these battles proved the 110th to be a coordinated and effective unit.

They also captured the Putnikovo brdo Barracks, which halted the summer offensive of the Serbs, who were attempting to advance to Usora.

=== Action in the Croat-Bosniak War ===
The 110th Usorska Brigade was one of the few units that did not turn on the Army of the Republic of Bosnia and Herzegovina (ARBiH) during the Croat-Bosniak war. Despite the intense fighting between the ARBiH and HVO, the 110th stayed allied with the ARBiH until the end of war.

== Cultural impact ==
The 110th Usorska Brigade was the subject of the Croatian War song "Lijo, Lisice, Zar Te Boli Glava" (English: "Lijo, Lisice, Does your Head Hurt?") The song mentions the 110th, stating "Slavko, didn’t the sign on tank use to say 'Lisica'?, But it now it says: Usorska is a glorious unit." The lyric is in reference to the 1st Krajina Corps commander Slavko Lisica's T-55 tanks, which had been captured by the 110th. The song also references how Lisica "fell as soon as he arrived at Komina" and states how his unit fell to the 110th.
