= Križančevo selo massacre =

1993 mass killing during the Croat–Bosniak War

- Part of the Croat–Bosniak War, the Bosnian War and the Yugoslav Wars
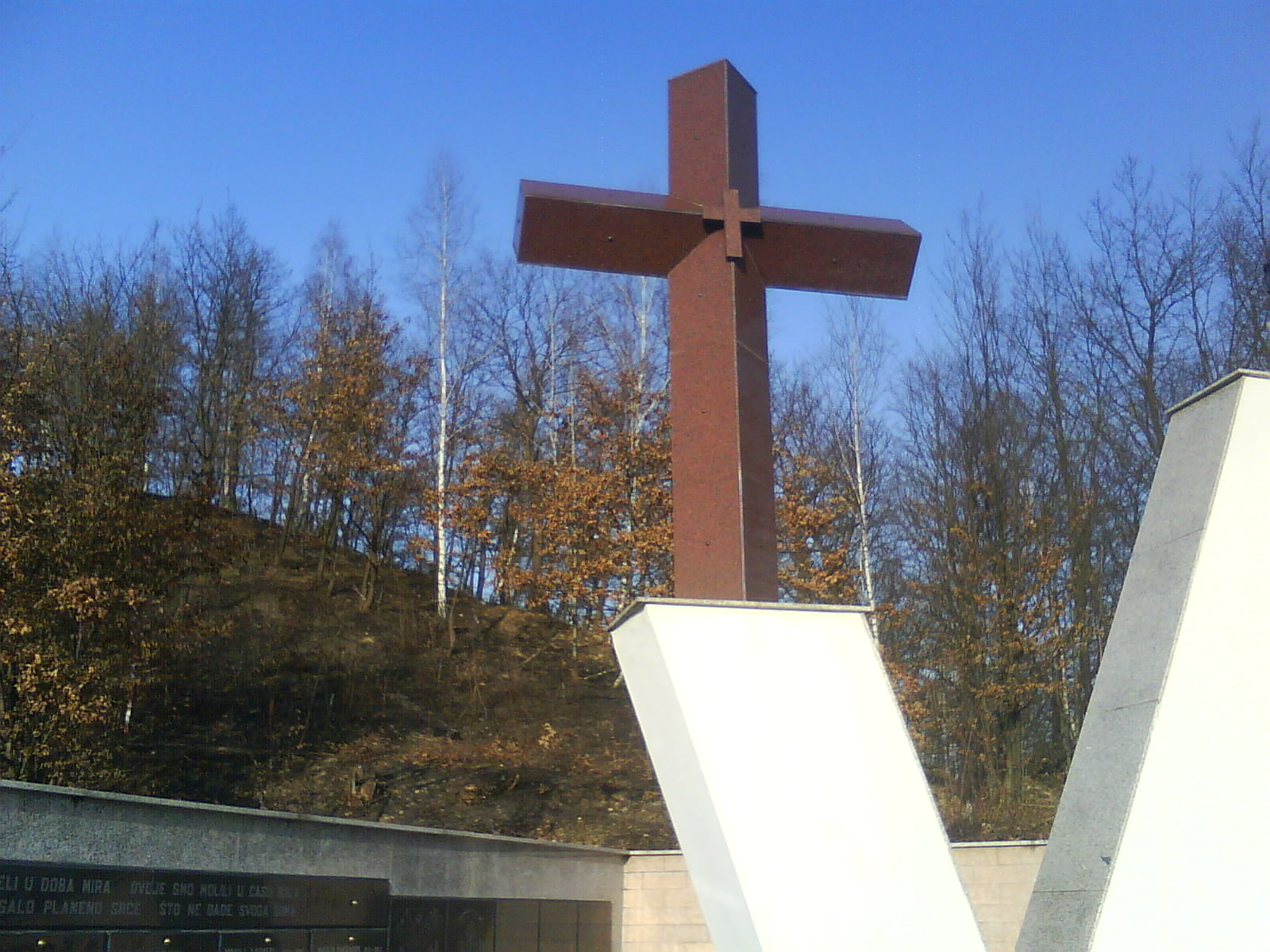
- Monument in the tribute of victims in Križančevo Selo
- Location: Križančevo selo, Bosnia and Herzegovina
- Date: 22 December 1993
- Target: Croats
- Attack type: Mass murder
- Deaths: 14–74
- Perpetrator: Army of the Republic of Bosnia and Herzegovina (ARBiH)

On 22 December 1993, after an attack by the Army of the Republic of Bosnia and Herzegovina (ARBiH) on Croatian Defence Council (HVO) positions in Križančevo selo, a hamlet in the Lašva Valley in central Bosnia, at least 14 Croat soldiers and civilians were killed.

== Attack on Križančevo selo ==
Throughout 1993, the region of central Bosnia was embroiled in the Croat–Bosniak war. In December 1993, ahead of the Christmas—New Year truce between the HVO and the ARBiH, the ARBiH launched several coordinated attacks against the HVO in the Vitez area. On 22 December, the ARBiH 325th Mountain Brigade captured the HVO-held Križančevo selo, a village situated near the town of Vitez, and the nearby hamlets of Šafradin and Dubravice. After the capture of the village, at least 12 HVO POWs and two captured Croat civilians were killed. Other sources mention several dozen killed, up to seventy-four, with some sources putting the number as high as a hundred.

== Aftermath and indictment ==
The attack was given official recognition from both relevant sides in the conflict in 2010, when the Croatian president Ivo Josipović, Bosnian Roman Catholic Cardinal Archbishop Vinko Puljić, and Bosniak imam Mustafa Cerić made a joint visit at the sites of the Ahmići massacre and the Križančevo selo massacre, and paid respect to the victims. Each year, memorial ceremonies in both the sites of the Ahmići massacre and Križančevo selo, are attended by the families of the victims and government representatives.

On 15 February 2019, the Court of Bosnia and Herzegovina indicted the commanders of the 325th Mountain Brigade for a "pre-planned and prepared attack on the HVO soldiers and Croat civilians in the villages of Križančevo selo, Šafradin and Dubravice". According to the indictment, at least 12 HVO POWs and two Croat women that did not take part in combat were killed. The trial in the case began in April 2019. On 19 September 2023, one of the defendants, Almir Sarajlić, was found guilty of taking part in the massacre in a first-instance judgement and sentenced to 20 years' imprisonment. The remaining seven defendants were found not guilty on all counts. The verdicts can be appealed.
