= Milivoj Petković =

Bosnian Croat army officer (born 1949)

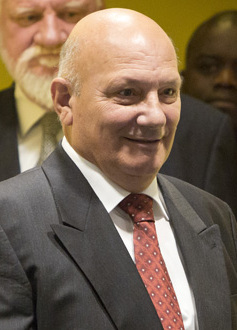
- Petković in 2013
- Born: 11 October 1949 (age 77); Šibenik, PR Croatia, FPR Yugoslavia
- Military career
- Allegiance: Yugoslavia (to 1991) Croatia (1991–1995) Herzeg-Bosnia (1991–1995)
- Branch: Yugoslav People's Army Croatian Army Croatian Defence Council
- Rank: Lieutenant general
- Commands: General Staff of HVO
- Conflicts: Croatian War of Independence Bosnian War Croat–Bosniak War

Milivoj Petković (born 11 October 1949) is a Bosnian Croat army officer and war criminal. He is among six defendants convicted by the International Criminal Tribunal for the former Yugoslavia (ICTY), in relation to the Croatian Republic of Herzeg-Bosnia during the Bosnian War. He was sentenced to 20 years in jail but only served four. The ICTY Appeals Chamber affirmed almost all of the convictions against Petković and his co-defendants, as well as their original length of sentence, on 29 November 2017.

== Background ==
Milivoj Petković was born in Šibenik, Dalmatia, FPR Yugoslavia to a Catholic family. Petković was a career military officer, graduating from the Yugoslav People's Army ("JNA") military academy. In July 1991 he left the JNA to join the new Croatian Army. In 1992 he was ordered by Croatian Army General Janko Bobetko to take over the Croatian Army's forward command center in the town of Grude, in Bosnia and Herzegovina, this force would later become the HVO armed forces. He was Chief of Staff of HVO until about 5 August 1994.

A General in the Croatian Army, he was partially disabled due to a concussion and spine injury sustained in June 1992 while driving near the Neretva River, as documented by the authorities of the then-Croatian Republic of Herzeg-Bosnia.

Petković voluntarily surrendered to the International Criminal Tribunal for the Former Yugoslavia (ICTY) on 5 April 2004. He was granted provisional release on 22 April 2008. However, his original 20 year sentence was later upheld on 29 November 2017.

== Indictment ==
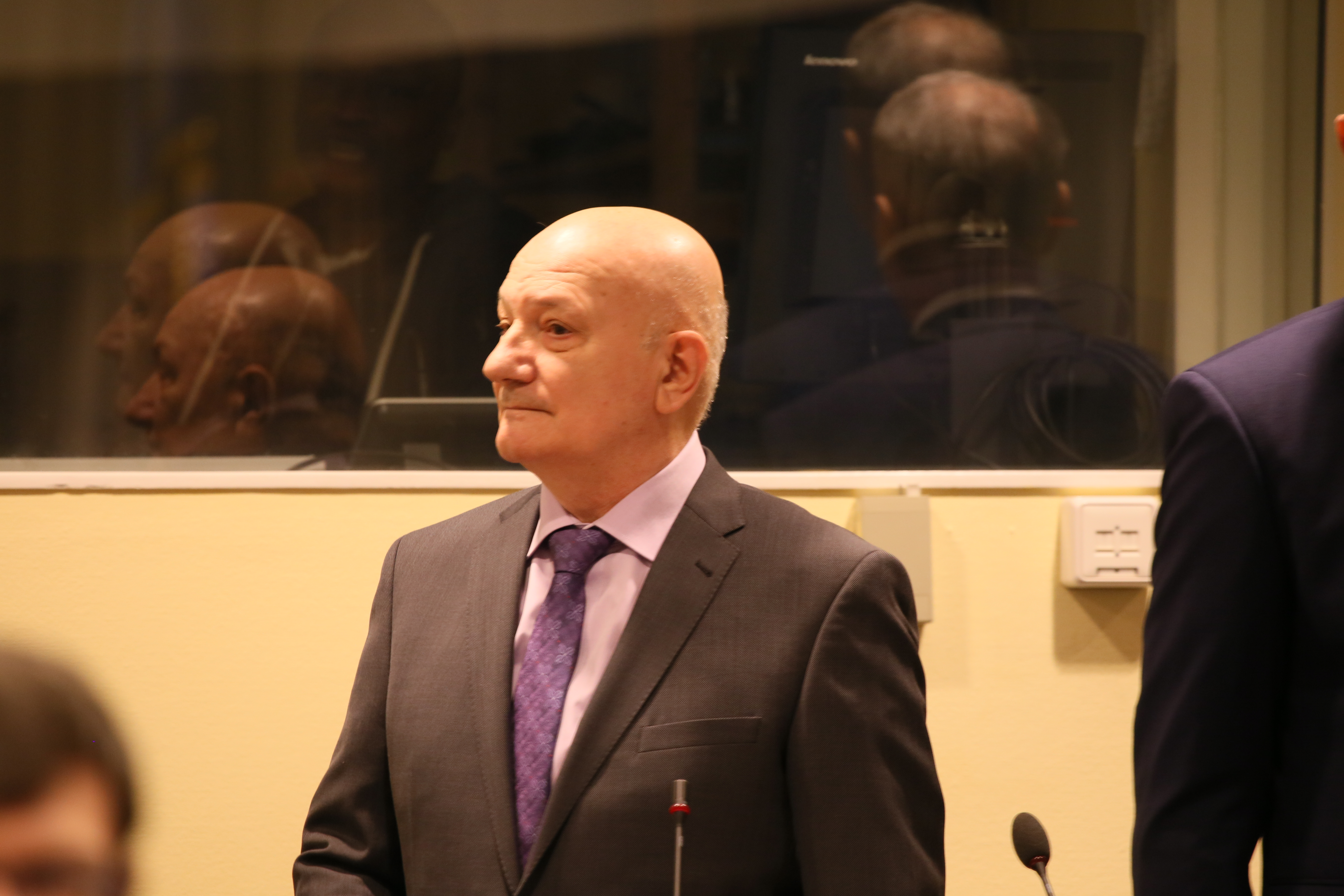
Petković at the International Criminal Tribunal for the former Yugoslavia in 2017

In the indictment it is alleged that, as the overall HVO commander, Petković directly commanded the Herceg-Bosna/HVO armed forces and is responsible for its actions. It is alleged that among other things the HVO armed forces:

- ethnically cleansed the districts of Gornji Vakuf, Mostar
- used the Heliodrom Camp as a detention centre where the Bosnian Muslims from Mostar were detained. Conditions at the Heliodrom concentration camp were deemed inhumane.

The charges were:

- nine counts of grave breaches of the Geneva conventions (wilful killing; inhuman treatment (sexual assault); unlawful deportation of a civilian; unlawful transfer of a civilian; unlawful confinement of a civilian; inhuman treatment (conditions of confinement); inhuman treatment; extensive destruction of property, not justified by military necessity and carried out unlawfully and wantonly; appropriation of property, not justified by military necessity and carried out unlawfully and wantonly).
- nine counts of violations of the laws or customs of war (cruel treatment (conditions of confinement); cruel treatment; unlawful labour; wanton destruction of cities, towns or villages, or destruction not justified by military necessity; destruction or wilful damage done to institutions dedicated to religion or education; plunder of public or private property; unlawful attack on civilians; unlawful infliction of terror on civilians; cruel treatment), and
- eight counts of crimes against humanity (persecutions on political, racial and religious grounds; murder; rape; deportation; inhumane acts (forcible transfer); imprisonment; inhumane acts (conditions of confinement); inhumane acts).

== See also ==
- Joint criminal enterprise
