= Çardak (disambiguation) =

The name Çardak might refer to:

- Çardak, a town and a district in Denizli Province, Turkey
- Çardak, Çanakkale
- Çardak, Silvan
- Çardak, Yenişehir
- Çardak, Yeşilova
- Çardak Airport, Denizli's airport situated in the town of Çardak, Turkey
- TCG Çardak, a ship of the Turkish Navy

== See also ==
- Čardak (disambiguation)
