= Ahmići massacre =

1993 mass killing during the Croat–Bosniak War

- Part of the Croat–Bosniak War
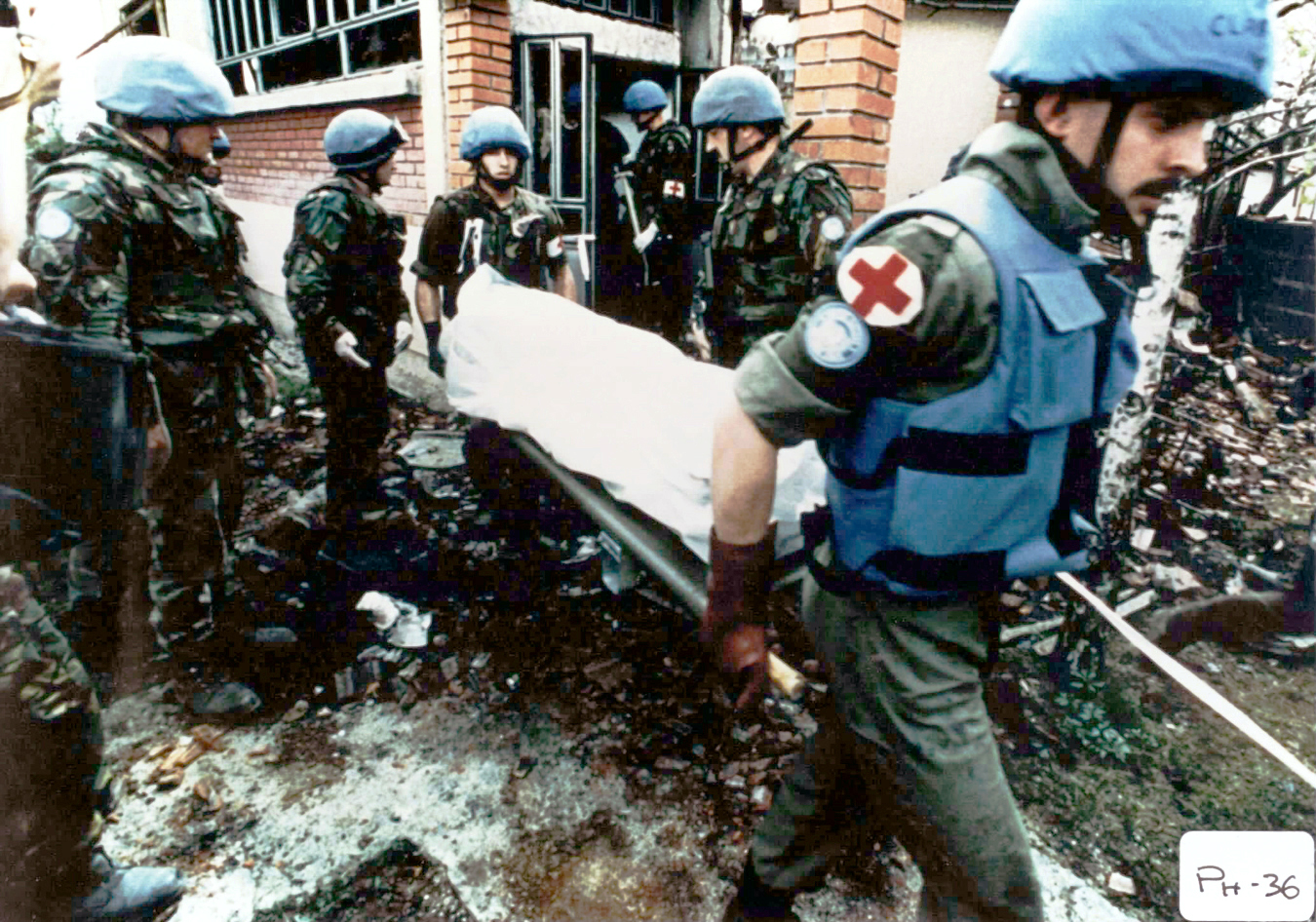
- UN peacekeepers collecting bodies
- Location of Ahmići within Bosnia and Herzegovina
- Location: 44°08′40″N 17°50′21″E; Ahmići in Vitez, Bosnia and Herzegovina
- Date: 16 April 1993; 05:30 (Central European Time)
- Target: Bosniak civilians
- Attack type: Mass killing, persecution, ethnic cleansing, crimes against humanity
- Deaths: 117–120
- Injuries: Unknown
- Perpetrator: Croatian Defence Council (HVO)
- Motive: Ethnic cleansing of Bosniaks in the Lašva Valley
- Inquiry: International Criminal Tribunal for the former Yugoslavia (ICTY), Prosecutor v. Kordić and Čerkez (IT-95-14/2)
- Convictions: Kordić: persecution (crimes against humanity); Čerkez: persecution and unlawful detention
- Convicted: Dario Kordić; Mario Čerkez

The Ahmići massacre was the mass murder of approximately 120 Bosniak civilians by members of the Croatian Defence Council in April 1993, during the Croat–Muslim War. The massacre was the culmination of the Lašva Valley ethnic cleansing committed by the political and military leadership of the Croatian Community of Herzeg-Bosnia. It was the largest massacre committed during the conflict between Bosnian Croats and the Bosnian Muslim-dominated Bosnian government.

The International Criminal Tribunal for the former Yugoslavia in The Hague has ruled that these crimes amounted to crimes against humanity in numerous verdicts against Croat political and military leaders and soldiers, most notably Dario Kordić, the political leader of Croats in Central Bosnia who was sentenced to 25 years in prison. The massacre was discovered by United Nations Peacekeeping troops of the 1st Battalion, Cheshire Regiment, drawn from the British Army, under the command of Colonel Bob Stewart.

== Background ==
Location of Ahmići in Bosnia and Herzegovina

Ahmići is a village in central Bosnia and Herzegovina, located in the municipality of Vitez in the Lašva Valley. According to the 1991 census, 466 people lived in the village. Three hundred fifty-six were Muslims, 87 were Croats, and 23 were classified as "others".

On 3 April 1993, the Bosnian Croat leadership met in Mostar to discuss the implementation of the Vance-Owen plan and decided to implement the creation of "Croatian Provinces" (Provinces 3, 8 and 10) placing the Bosnian armed forces under the command of the General Staff of the Croatian Defence Council (HVO), the military formation of Bosnian Croats.

On 4 April, according to Reuters, the HVO headquarters in Mostar set a deadline for the Chairman of the Presidency of the Republic of Bosnia and Herzegovina Alija Izetbegović to sign the above agreement. They stated, "If Izetbegović fails to sign this agreement by 15 April, the HVO will unilaterally enforce its jurisdiction in cantons three, eight and ten". In a message from HVO leaders Dario Kordić, Ignac Koštroman and Anto Valenta, Croats were instructed to display more Croatian flags on buildings.

== An organised attack ==
On Friday, 16 April 1993 at 05:30, Croatian forces simultaneously attacked Vitez, Stari Vitez, Ahmići, Nadioci, Šantici, Pirići, Novaci, Putiš and Donja Večeriska. HVO General Tihomir Blaškić spoke of 20 to 22 sites of simultaneous combat all along the road linking Vitez, Travnik, and Busovača. The ICTY Trial Chamber found that this was a planned attack against the Bosnian Muslim civilian population. The attack was preceded by several political declarations announcing that a conflict between Croatian forces and Bosnian forces was imminent. On the day of the attack, telephone lines had been cut because all communication exchanges in the municipality of Vitez were under HVO control.

Croat inhabitants of those villages were warned of the attack, and some were involved in preparing it. Croat women and children had been evacuated on the eve of the fighting. The method of attack displayed a high level of preparation. The attacks in the built-up areas, such as those carried out in the Ahmići area were operations planned in minute detail to kill or drive out the Bosnian Muslim population, resulting in a massacre. On the evening of 15 April, unusual HVO troop movements had been noticed.

On the morning of 16 April, the main roads were blocked by Croat troops. According to several international observers, the attack occurred from three sides. It was designed to force the fleeing population towards the south, where elite marksmen with particularly sophisticated weapons shot those escaping. Other troops, organised in small groups of about five to ten soldiers, went from house to house setting them on fire and killing the residents. Around one hundred soldiers took part in the operation. The attack resulted in the massacre of the Bosnian Muslim villagers and the destruction of the village. Among the more than 100 who died were 32 women and 11 children under the age of 18. The HVO artillery aimed to support the infantry and destroy structures which the infantry could not. The mosque, for example, was hit by a shot from a powerful weapon. Later, the minaret was blown up by Bralo and Jukić.

== Murders of civilians ==
Overall, 117 to 120 Bosnian Muslims were killed in the massacre. Most of the men were shot at point blank range. Some men had been rounded up and then killed by Croatian soldiers. Twenty or so civilians were also killed in Donji Ahmići as they tried to flee the village. The fleeing inhabitants had to cross an open field before getting to the main road. About twenty bodies of people killed by exact shots were found in the field. Military experts concluded that marksmen had shot them. Other bodies were found in the houses so badly charred they could not be identified, and in positions suggesting they had been burned alive. The victims included many women and children.

A European Community Monitor Mission observer said he had seen the bodies of children who, from their position, seemed to have died in agony in the flames: "some of the houses were absolute scenes of horror, because not only were the people dead, but there were those who were burned and some had been burned with flame launchers, which had charred the bodies and this was the case of several of the bodies". According to the ECMM report, at least 103 people were killed during the attack on Ahmići.

== Destruction of property ==
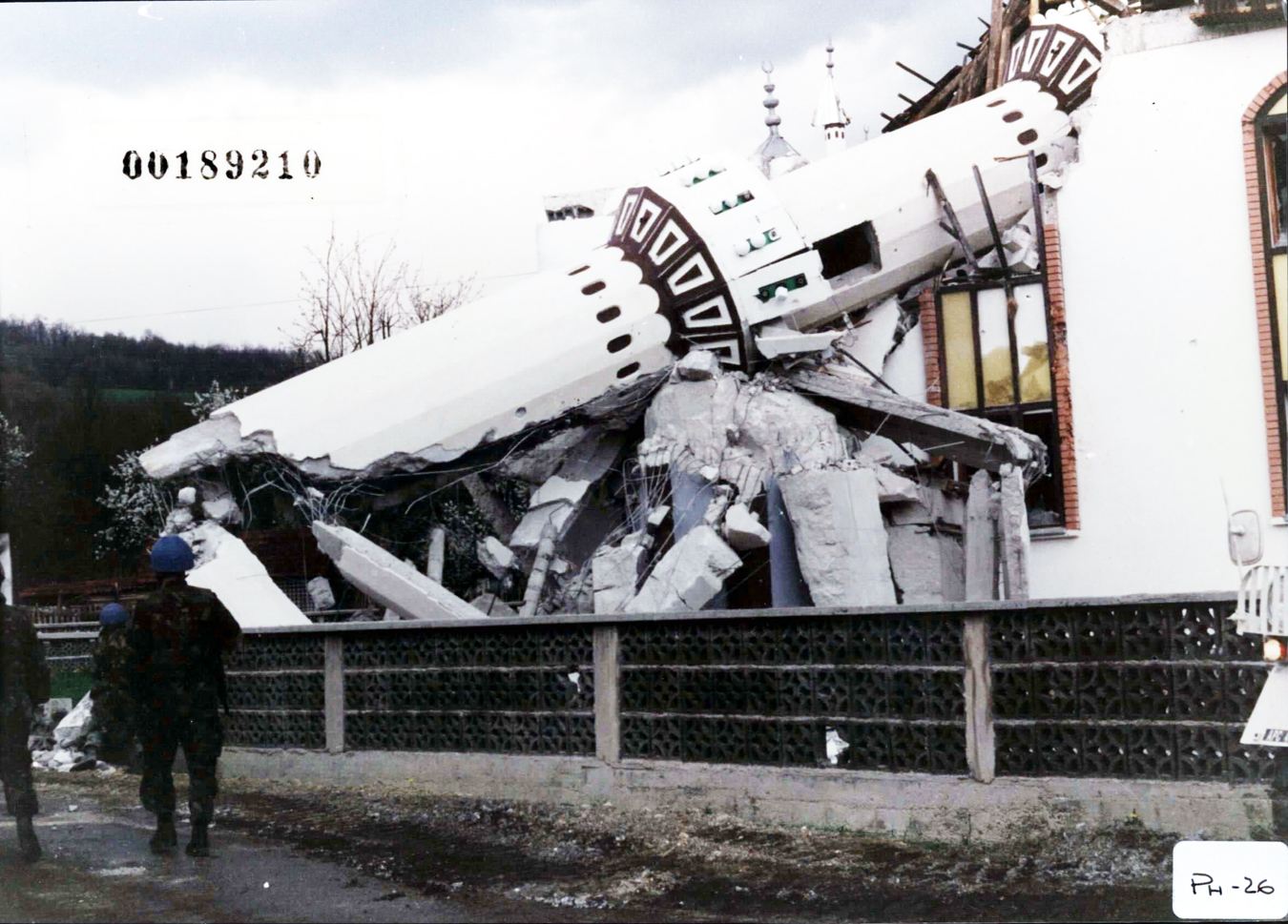
Bombed mosque in April 1993, Ahmići.

According to the Centre for Human Rights in Zenica, 180 of the existing 200 Bosnian Muslim houses in Ahmići were burned during the attack. The Commission on Human Rights made the same finding in its report dated 19 May 1993. According to the ECMM, practically all the Bosnian Muslim houses in the villages of Ahmići, Nadioci, Pirići, Sivrino Selo, Gaćice, Gomionica, Gromiljak and Rotilj had been burned. According to the ECMM observer, "it was a whole area that was burning". Several religious buildings were destroyed. Two mosques were deliberately mined from the inside. Furthermore, the mosque in Donji Ahmići was damaged by explosives laid around the base of its minaret.

== The troops involved ==
The troops involved in the attack included the Military Police Fourth Battalion, particularly the Džokeri Unit. The Džokeri (Jokers), an anti-terrorist squad with twenty or so members, were created in January 1993 from within the Military Police on the order of Zvonko Voković, whose mission was to carry out special assignments such as sabotage, stationed at the bungalow in Nadioci. Other participants included the Vitezovi, the Viteška brigade of the municipality of Vitez, the Nikola Šubić Zrinski brigade of Busovača, together with Domobrani units (units set up in each village under a decision from Mostar dated 8 February 1993) stationed at Ahmići, Šantići, Pirići and Nadioci. Many witnesses in the Blaškić case also referred to soldiers in camouflage uniforms being present, wearing the emblem of the HVO. Several Croat inhabitants of these villages also participated in the attack. They were members of the Domobrani, such as Slavko Miličević for the Donji Ahmići sector, Žarko Papić for the Zume area, Branko Perković in Nadioci, Zoran Kupreškić in Grabovi (a location in the centre of Ahmići), Nenad Šantić and Colic in Šantići.

== Trial ==
The International Criminal Tribunal for the former Yugoslavia (ICTY) in the Hague has ruled that these crimes amounted to crimes against humanity in numerous verdicts against Croat political and military leaders and soldiers, most notably Dario Kordić, political leader of Croats in Central Bosnia who was sentenced to 25 years in prison. Based on the evidence of numerous HVO attacks at that time, the ICTY Trial Chamber concluded in the Kordić and Čerkez case that by April 1993 Croat leadership had a standard design or plan conceived and executed to ethnically cleanse Bosnian Muslims from the Lašva Valley. Dario Kordić, as the local political leader, was found to be the planner and instigator of this plan.

Further concluding that the Croatian Army was involved in the campaign, the ICTY defined the events as an international conflict between Bosnia and Herzegovina and Croatia.

Former Croatian president Stjepan Mesić revealed thousands of documents and audio tapes recorded by Franjo Tuđman about his plans during a case against Croat leaders from Bosnia and Herzegovina for war crimes committed against Bosnian Muslims. During the trial against Tihomir Blaškić, who was the HVO commander for the Central Bosnian Operative Zone, for the crimes in Ahmići, the defence argued that there was a parallel line of command surpassing Blaškić that went to the political leadership of Herzeg-Bosnia. There were reports in the media that Tuđman himself participated in the cover-up. The appeals chamber of the ICTY ruled that Blaškić did not have command responsibility for the massacre and lowered the initial sentence (in 2000) of 45 years to nine years of imprisonment. He was released after serving 8 years and 4 months of his sentence.

The ICTY initially indicted sixteen Croats and convicted eight of them for their roles in the Lašva Valley ethnic cleansing. Ignac Koštroman and Anto Valenta were never charged by the ICTY.

Dario Kordic was released in June 2014 after serving two-thirds of his sentence.[2] Kordic glorified his crime and showed no regret for his part in the massacre."He asked me privately if the prison, the war, was worth it. I told him I would do it all over again, I wouldn't change a second, every second was worth it," he said.

== Tribute ==
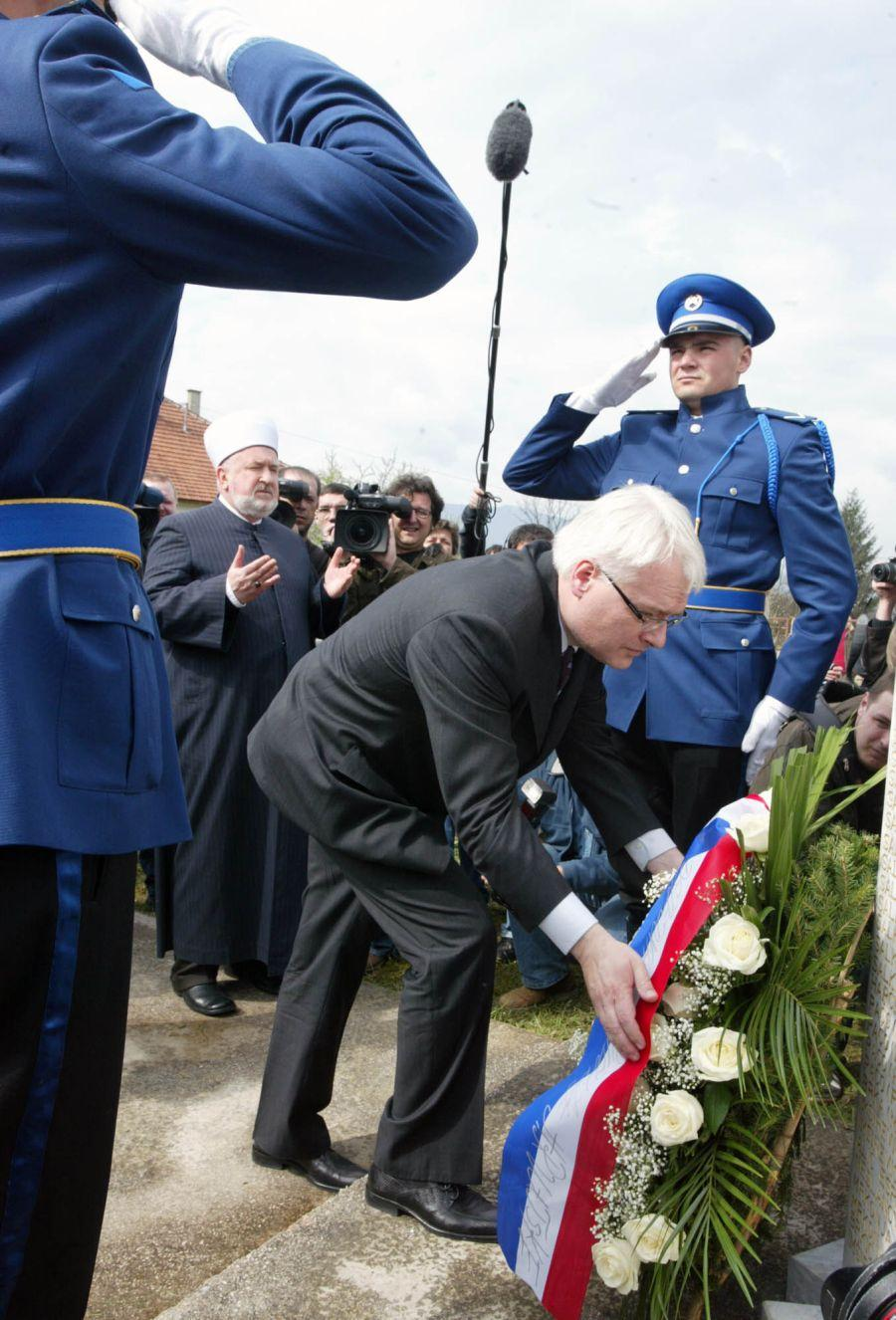
Ivo Josipović and Mustafa Cerić by the commemoration's wreath

Croatia's president Ivo Josipović, alongside Islamic and Catholic religious leaders, paid tribute on 15 April 2010 to victims in Ahmići and Križančevo selo. None of the accused sentenced criminals ever paid tribute to the victims. Even today local Croats see this as legitimate action and that all trials against perpetrators are sabotaged.

President of the International Residual Mechanism for Criminal Tribunals (Mechanism), Judge Graciela Gatti Santana paid tribute to Ahmici.

== See also ==
- List of massacres in Bosnia and Herzegovina
- List of massacres of Bosnian Muslims
