= Ahmići =

Ahmići Ахмићи
- Village
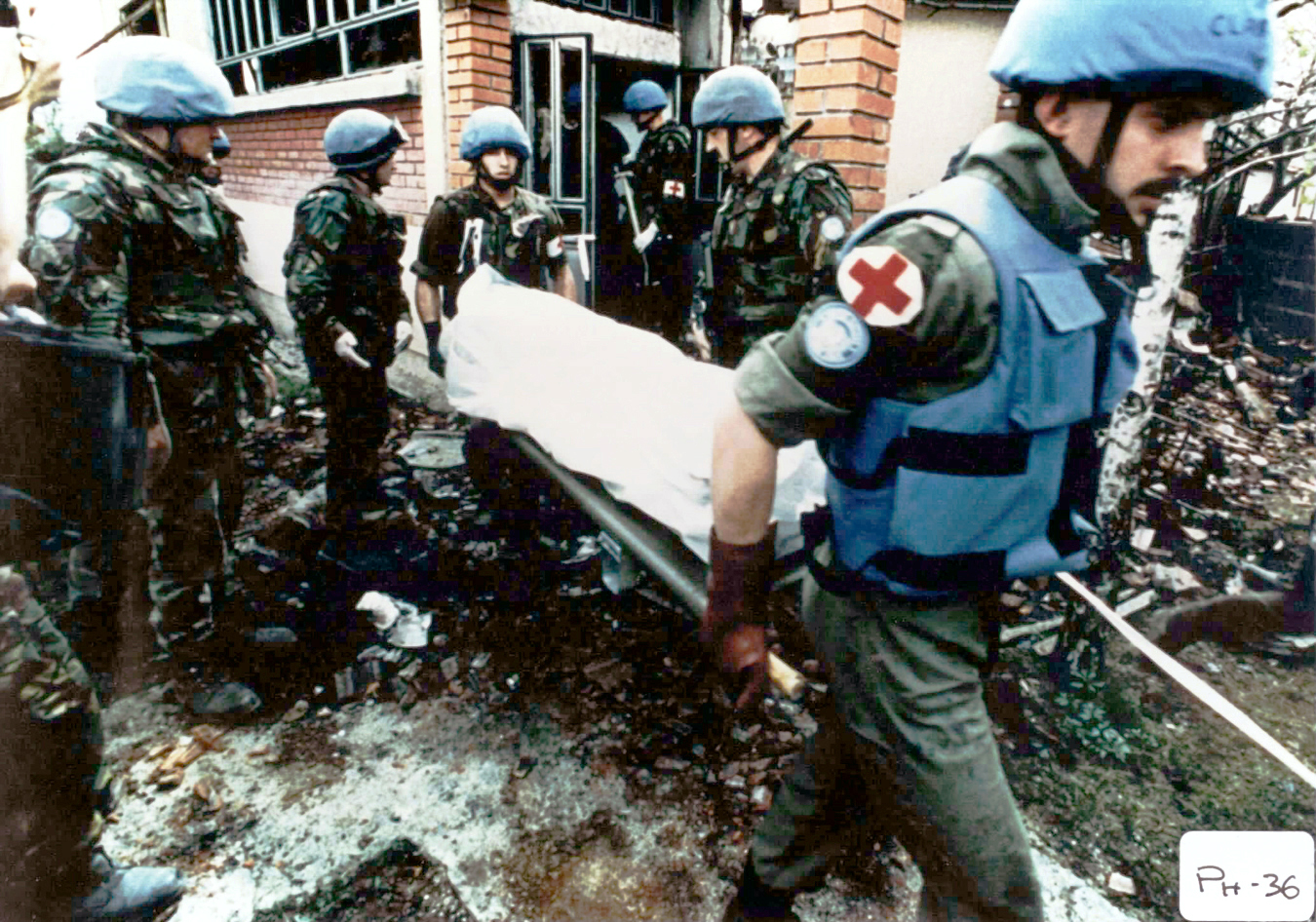
- UN peacekeepers collecting bodies from Ahmići, Bosnia and Herzegovina in April 1993

- Location within Bosnia and Herzegovina
- Coordinates: 44°8′46″N 17°51′12″E
- Country: Bosnia and Herzegovina
- Entity: Federation of Bosnia and Herzegovina
- Canton: Central Bosnia
- Municipality: Vitez

Area
  - Total: 0.90 sq mi (2.33 km^{2})

Population (2013)
  - Total: 506
  - Density: 562/sq mi (217/km^{2})
- Time zone: UTC+1 (CET)
  - Summer (DST): UTC+2 (CEST)

Ahmići (Serbian Cyrillic: Ахмићи) is a village in central Bosnia and Herzegovina. It is located in the municipality of Vitez in the Lašva river valley.

In April 1993 during the Lašva Valley ethnic cleansing, the Croatian Defence Council forces attacked the village and massacred around 120 civilians in the Ahmići massacre. Since then many survivors have returned and have begun to rebuild their homes.

== Population ==
=== Ethnic composition, census 1991 ===
total: 466

- ethnic Muslims - 356 (76.39%)
- Croats - 87 (18.66%)
- Yugoslavs - 2 (0.42%)
- others and unknown - 21 (4.50%)

These numbers are in dispute, see the Ahmici massacre article for another pre-war (1991) analysis.

=== census 2013 ===
According to the 2013 census, its population was 506.

Ethnicity in 2013
Ethnicity	Number	Percentage
Bosniaks	329	65.0%
Croats	176	34.8%
other/undeclared	1	0.2%
Total	506	100%
