= Čardak, Zavidovići =

Čardak Чардак
- Village
- Location within Bosnia and Herzegovina
- Coordinates: 44.3863061°N 18.1759566°E
- Country: Bosnia and Herzegovina
- Entity: Federation of Bosnia and Herzegovina
- Canton: Zenica-Doboj
- Municipality: Zavidovići

Area
  - Total: 1.70 sq mi (4.41 km^{2})

Population (2013)
  - Total: 156
  - Density: 91.6/sq mi (35.4/km^{2})
- Time zone: UTC+1 (CET)
  - Summer (DST): UTC+2 (CEST)

Čardak is a village in the municipality of Zavidovići, Bosnia and Herzegovina.

== Demographics ==
According to the 2013 census, its population was 156.

Ethnicity in 2013
Ethnicity	Number	Percentage
Bosniaks	148	94.4%
Serbs	5	3.2%
other/undeclared	3	1.9%
Total	156	100%
