= Lašva Valley ethnic cleansing =

War crimes committed in the Bosnian war

- Part of Bosnian War and Croat–Bosniak War
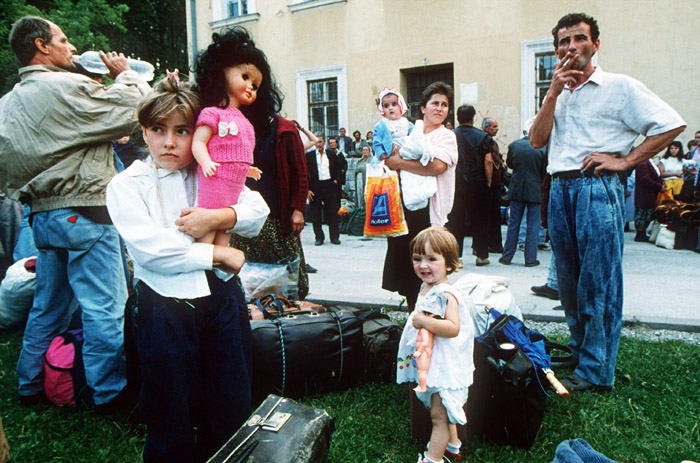
- Refugees in Travnik, a town in the Lašva Valley, 1992–1993. Photo by Mikhail Evstafiev
- Location: 44°12′07″N 17°43′00″E; Lašva Valley, Bosnia and Herzegovina
- Date: May 1992 − April 1993
- Target: Bosniaks
- Attack type: Ethnic cleansing
- Victim: 1,300 deaths
- Perpetrator: HVO
- Motive: Croatian nationalism; Croatian irredentism; Greater Croatia; Croatisation; Anti-Bosniak sentiment

The Lašva Valley ethnic cleansing, also known as the Lašva Valley case, refers to numerous war crimes committed during the Bosnian War by the Croatian Community of Herzeg-Bosnia's political and military leadership on Bosniak civilians in the Lašva Valley region of Bosnia-Herzegovina. The campaign, planned from May 1992 to March 1993 and erupting the following April, was meant to implement objectives set forth by Croat nationalists in November 1991. The Lašva Valley's Bosniaks were subjected to persecution on political, and religious grounds, deliberately discriminated against in the context of a widespread attack on the region's civilian population and suffered mass murder, rape and wartime sexual violence, imprisonment in camps, as well as the destruction of religious and cultural sites and private property. This was often followed by anti-Bosniak propaganda, particularly in the municipalities of Vitez, Busovača, Novi Travnik and Kiseljak.

The International Criminal Tribunal for the Former Yugoslavia (ICTY) has ruled that these crimes amounted to crimes against humanity in numerous verdicts against Croat political and military leaders and soldiers, most notably Dario Kordić. Based on the evidence of numerous HVO attacks at that time, the ICTY Trial Chamber concluded in the Kordić and Čerkez case that by April 1993 Croat leadership had a common design or plan conceived and executed to ethnically cleanse Bosniaks from the Lašva Valley. Dario Kordić, as the local political leader, was found to be the planner and instigator of this plan. Further concluding that the Croatian Army was involved in the campaign, the ICTY defined the events as an international conflict between Bosnia and Herzegovina and Croatia.

== Background ==
During the Yugoslav wars, the objectives within Croatia were shared by the Croats of Bosnia and Herzegovina. The ruling party in the Republic of Croatia, the Croatian Democratic Union (HDZ), organized and controlled the branch of the party in Bosnia and Herzegovina. By the latter part of 1991, the more extreme elements of the party, under the leadership of Mate Boban, Dario Kordić, Jadranko Prlić, Ignac Koštroman and local leaders such as Anto Valenta, and with the support of Franjo Tuđman and Gojko Šušak, had taken effective control of the party. On 18 November 1991, the party branch in Bosnia and Herzegovina, proclaimed the existence of the Croatian Community of Herzeg-Bosnia, as a separate political, cultural, economic and territorial whole, on the territory of Bosnia and Herzegovina.

The ICTY illustrated this with the minutes of a meeting held on 12 November 1991 and signed by Mate Boban and Dario Kordić: "the Croatian people in Bosnia and Herzegovina must finally embrace a determined and active policy which will realise our eternal dream – a common Croatian state". On 10 April 1992, Mate Boban decreed that the Bosnian Territorial Defence (TO), which had been created the day before, was illegal on self-proclaimed Croat territory. On 11 May, Tihomir Blaškić declared the TO illegal on the territory of the Kiseljak municipality.

== Discrimination ==
During 1992, the Bosniak authorities and civilians of Vitez, Busovača and Kiseljak were regularly discriminated against. Conditions became so onerous for Bosniak civilians that many of them decided to leave the area and move to municipalities where they would be in the majority. Those who nevertheless chose to remain in those municipalities had to accept that they would be subject to persecution by a political and military regime increasingly hostile to them. The first destruction of mosques and Bosniak homes, the first murders of civilians, and the first acts of pillage occurred at this time.

=== Vitez ===
In April 1992, the leader of the HDZ in Vitez, Anto Valenta, told the municipality's Bosniak representatives that they should take their orders from the self-proclaimed Croatian Community of Herzeg-Bosnia. On 20 May 1992, a Bosnian Army soldier was killed in front of the Vitez Hotel while two others were captured and beaten. In June 1992, Croat military formations took over the headquarters in Vitez and the Municipal Assembly building and raised the flags of Herzeg-Bosnia and of Croatia. Later, in November 1992, the municipality introduced new taxes and asked members of staff to sign a declaration of allegiance to the new Croat Government, threatening those that did not obey with dismissal. Many Bosniaks were refused access to public institutions because they had refused to sign the declaration and they were unable to get the Laissez-Passer necessary to drive on the roads that the Croat forces had taken over.

=== Busovača ===
The same practice was also carried out in Busovača. On 10 May 1992, Dario Kordić and Ivo Brnada decided to revoke the arms distribution agreement which had been concluded with the Bosnian Territorial Defence, seize all weapons, and take control of the barracks. They then issued an ultimatum to all Bosnian military units calling on them to surrender their weapons and to place themselves under Croat command. By a decree dated 22 May 1992, Dario Kordić and Florian Glavočević proceeded to give the HVO general administrative powers over the municipality. After those two decrees had been adopted, Bosnian state organs were abolished and Bosniaks were progressively excluded from local political structures. Croat forces also seized the television broadcasting station at Skradno and created its own local radio and television to carry propaganda, seized the public institutions, raised the Croatian flag over public institution buildings, and imposed the Croatian Dinar as the unit of currency. During this time, Busovača's Bosniaks were forced to sign an act of allegiance to the Croat authorities, fell victim to numerous attacks on shops and businesses and, gradually, left the area out of fear that they would be the victims of mass crimes.

=== Kiseljak ===
As in the municipalities of Vitez and Busovača, a similar pattern was applied in Kiseljak from April to November 1992, demonstrating the Croat authorities' resolve to take political and military control of the Kiseljak municipality. The authorities created a radio station which broadcast nationalist propaganda. General Blaškić expelled the Bosnian Territorial Defence from the former Yugoslav People's Army (JNA) buildings on 14 May 1992.

== Ethnic cleansing ==
In June 1992, the focus switched to Novi Travnik where Croat efforts to gain control were met with resistance. On 18 June 1992 the Bosnian government forces in Novi Travnik received an ultimatum from the HVO which included demands to abolish existing government institutions, pledge allegiance to a newly established Croat authority, subordinate Bosnian forces to the HVO and expel Bosniak refugees – all within 24 hours. On 19 June 1992 armed conflict broke out. The fighting lasted two hours and the headquarters of the Bosnian Territorial Defence, the elementary school and the post office were attacked and damaged by local Croat units, including units from Vitez and Busovača. Bosniaks in the lower part of the town were subjected to killings, rape and other mistreatment.

During August 1992, the Croat forces launched attacks on the villages of Duhri, Potkraj, Radanovići and Topole and these attacks involved more violent incidents, including the setting of Bosniak homes on fire and vandalising their businesses. Many civilians who feared future attacks started to leave the Kiseljak enclave at this time.

The ICTY Trial Chamber in the Kordić and Čerkez case decided that the weight of the evidence points clearly to the persecution of Bosniak civilians in the Central Bosnian municipalities taken over by the Croat forces: Busovača, Novi Travnik, Vareš, Kiseljak, Vitez, Kreševo and Žepče. The persecution followed a consistent pattern in each municipality and demonstrated that the HVO had launched a campaign against the Bosniaks in them with the hope that the self-proclaimed Croatian Community of Herzeg-Bosnia should secede from Bosnia and Herzegovina and with a view towards unification with Croatia.

By December 1992, Croat forces had taken control of the municipalities of the Lašva Valley and had only met significant opposition in Novi Travnik and Ahmići. Much of Central Bosnia was in the hands of the Croats.

=== Gornji Vakuf shelling ===
Gornji Vakuf is a town to the south of the Lašva Valley and of strategic importance at a crossroads en route to Central Bosnia. It is 48 kilometres from Novi Travnik and about one hour's drive from Vitez in an armoured vehicle. For Croats it was a very important connection between the Lašva Valley and Herzegovina, two territories included in the self-proclaimed Croatian Community of Herzeg-Bosnia.

On 10 January 1993, just before the outbreak of hostilities in Gornji Vakuf, the HVO commander Luka Šekerija, sent a "Military – Top Secret" request to Colonel Blaškić and Dario Kordić for rounds of mortar shells available at the ammunition factory in Vitez. Fighting then broke out in Gornji Vakuf on 11 January 1993, sparked by a bomb which had been placed by Croats in a Bosniak-owned hotel that had been used as a military headquarters. A general outbreak of fighting followed and there was heavy shelling of the town that night by Croat artillery.

During cease-fire negotiations at the Britbat HQ in Gornji Vakuf, colonel Andrić, representing the HVO, demanded that the Bosnian forces lay down their arms and accept HVO control of the town, threatening that if they did not agree he would flatten Gornji Vakuf to the ground. The HVO demands were not accepted by the Bosnian Army and the attack continued, followed by massacres on Bosnian Muslim civilians in the neighbouring villages of Bistrica, Uzričje, Duša, Ždrimci and Hrasnica. Although Croats often cited it as a major reason for the attack on Gornji Vakuf, the commander of the British Britbat company claimed that there were no Muslim holy warriors in Gornji Vakuf (commonly known as Mujahideen) and that his soldiers did not see any.

=== Busovača massacre ===
On the morning of 25 January 1993, Croat forces attacked the Bosniak part of the town of Busovača called Kadića Strana following the 20 January ultimatum. The attack included shelling from the surrounding hills. A loudspeaker called on Bosniaks to surrender. A police report shows that 43 people were massacred in Busovača in January and February 1993. The remaining Bosniaks (around 90 in all) were rounded up in the town square. Women and children (around 20 in total) were allowed to return home and the men (70 in all), some as young as 14–16 years, were loaded onto buses and taken to Kaonik camp. The violence continued after the January attack.

=== Ahmići massacre ===
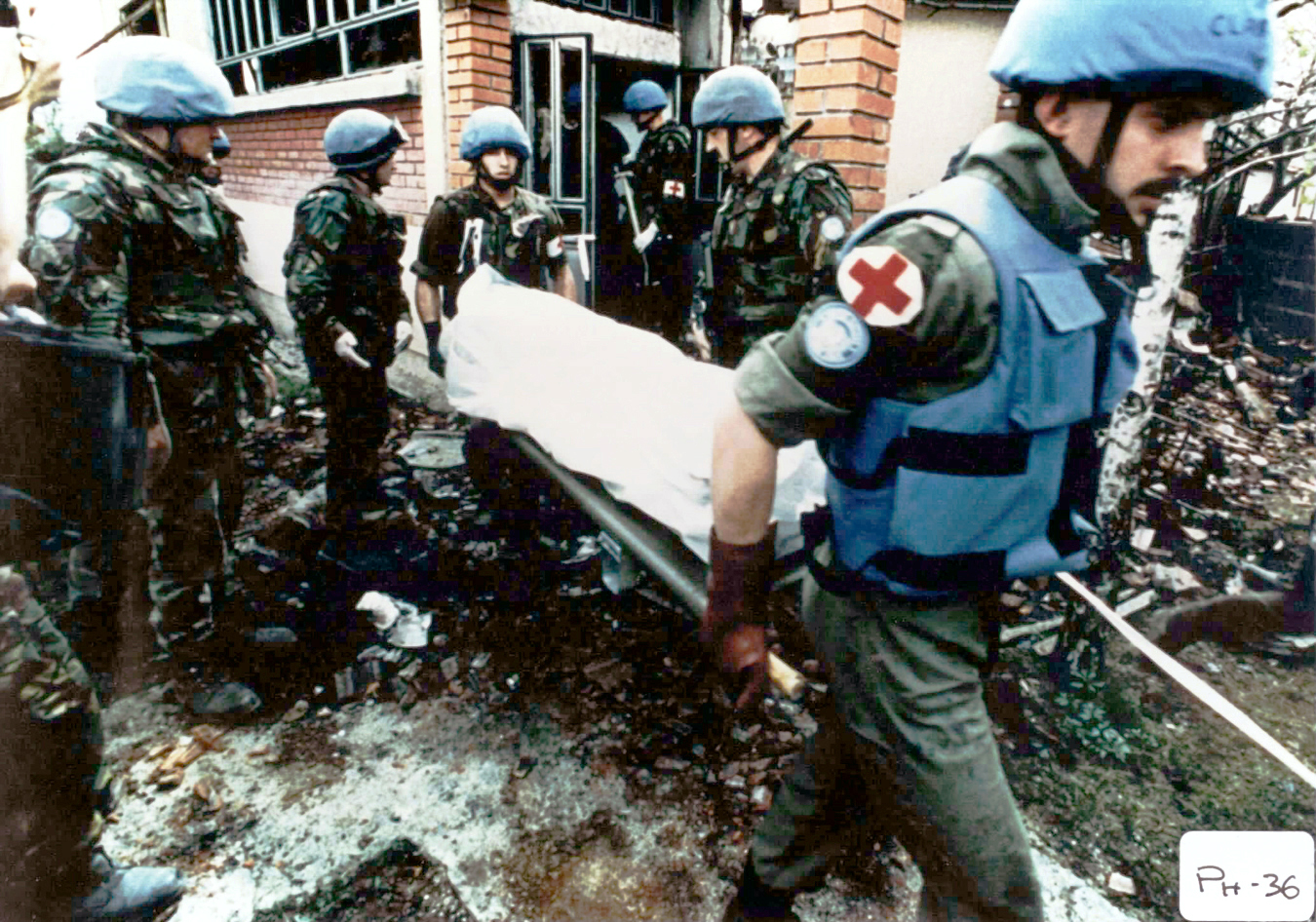
UN Peace keepers collecting bodies from Ahmići in April 1993. (Photograph provided courtesy of the ICTY)

The Ahmići massacre was the culmination of the Lašva Valley ethnic cleansing. It is the biggest massacre committed during the conflict between Croats and the Bosnian government.

The attack began at 05:30 hours on 16 April 1993. The Croat Defence Council (HVO) shelled the Bosniak part of Ahmići and moved in killing many Bosniaks, including women, children and the elderly. They destroyed a large number of Bosniak homes, and caused extensive damage to the village's two mosques. An estimate puts the death toll at 120. The youngest was a three-month-old baby, who was machine-gunned to death in his crib, and the oldest was an 81-year-old woman.

==== Background ====
On 3 April 1993, the Croat leadership met in Mostar to discuss the implementation of the Vance-Owen Peace Plan. The Croats decided to implement the creation of "Croatian Provinces" (Provinces 3, 8 and 10) placing the Bosnian armed forces under the command of the General Staff of the HVO. On 4 April, according to Reuters, the HVO HQ in Mostar set a deadline for President Izetbegović to sign the above agreement and stated: If Izetbegović fails to sign this agreement by 15 April, the HVO will unilaterally enforce its jurisdiction in cantons three, eight and ten. In a message from Kordić, Ignac Koštroman and Anto Valenta, the Croat people were told to display more Croatian flags on buildings.

==== An organized attack ====
On Friday, 16 April 1993 at 05:30 hours, Croatian forces simultaneously attacked Vitez, Stari Vitez, Ahmići, Nadioci, Šantići, Pirići, Novaci, Putiš and Donja Večeriska. General Blaškić spoke of 20 to 22 sites of simultaneous combat all along the road linking Travnik, Vitez and Busovača. The ICTY Trial Chamber found that this was a planned attack against the Bosniak civilian population. The attack was preceded by several political declarations announcing that a conflict between Croatian forces and Bosnian forces was imminent. On the day of the attack, telephone lines had been cut because all communication exchanges in the municipality of Vitez were under HVO control.

Croat inhabitants of those villages were warned of the attack and some of them were involved in preparing it. Croat women and children had been evacuated on the eve of the fighting. The method of attack displayed a high level of preparation. The attacks in the built-up areas, such as those carried out in the Ahmići area were operations planned in minute detail with the aim of killing or driving out the Bosniak population, resulting in a massacre. On the evening of 15 April, unusual HVO troop movements had been noticed. On the morning of 16 April, the main roads were blocked by Croat troops. According to several international observers, the attack occurred from three sides and was designed to force the fleeing population towards the south where elite marksmen with particularly sophisticated weapons shot those escaping. Other troops, organised in small groups of about five to ten soldiers, went from house to house setting them on fire and killing the residents. Around one hundred soldiers who took part in the operation. The attack resulted in the massacre of the Bosniak villagers and the destruction of the village. Among the more than 100 who died were 32 women and 11 boys and girls under the age of 18. The aim of the HVO artillery was to support the infantry and destroy structures which the infantry couldn't. The mosque, for example, was hit by a shot from a powerful weapon. Later the minaret was blown up by Bralo and Jukić.

==== Murders of civilians ====
Most of the men were shot at point blank range. Some men had been rounded up and then killed by Croatian soldiers. Twenty or so civilians were also killed in Donji Ahmići as they tried to flee the village. The fleeing inhabitants had to cross an open field before getting to the main road. About twenty bodies of people killed by very precise shots were found in the field. Military experts concluded that they had been shot by marksmen. Other bodies were found in the houses so badly charred they could not be identified and in positions suggesting that they had been burned alive. The victims included many women and children.

An ECMM observer said he had seen the bodies of children who, from their position, seemed to have died in agony in the flames: "some of the houses were absolute scenes of horror, because not only were the people dead, but there were those who were burned and obviously some had been burned with flame launchers, which had charred the bodies and this was the case of several of the bodies". According to the ECMM report, at least 103 people were killed during the attack on Ahmići.

==== Destruction of property ====
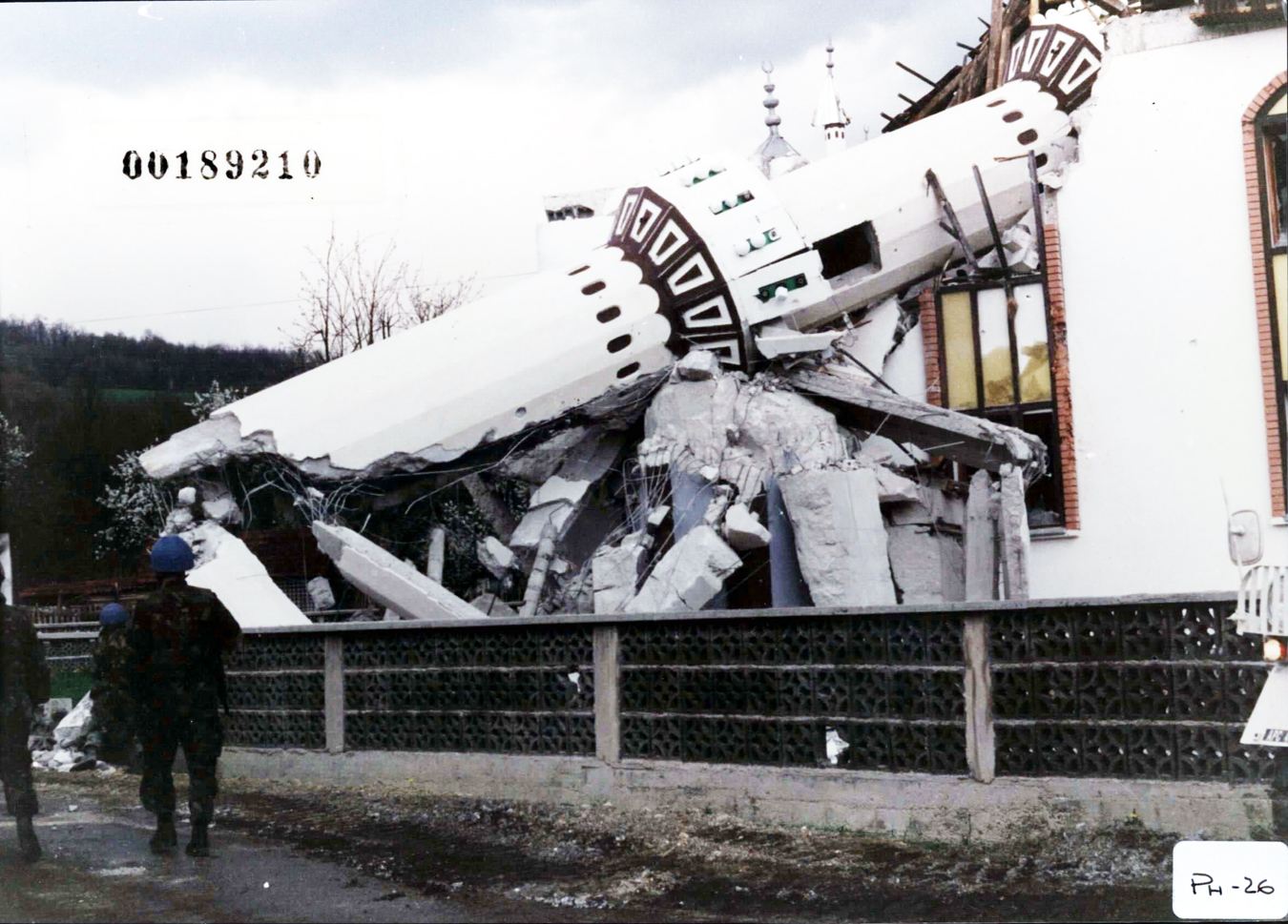
Bombed mosque in April 1993, Ahmići. (Photograph provided courtesy of the ICTY)

According to the Centre for Human Rights in Zenica, 180 of the existing 200 Bosniak houses in Ahmići were burned during the attack. The Commission on Human Rights made the same finding in its report dated 19 May 1993. According to the ECMM practically all the Bosnian Muslim houses in the villages of Ahmići, Nadioci, Pirići, Sivrino Selo, Gaćice, Gomionica, Gromiljak and Rotilj had been burned. According to ECMM observer "it was a whole area that was burning". Several religious buildings were destroyed. Two mosques were deliberately mined and given the careful placement of the explosives inside the buildings. Furthermore, the mosque in Donji Ahmići was destroyed by explosives laid around the base of its minaret.

==== The troops involved ====
The troops involved in the attack included the Military Police Fourth Battalion and, in particular, the Džokeri Unit. The Džokeri (Jokers), an anti-terrorist squad with twenty or so members, were created in January 1993 from within the Military Police on the order of Zvonko Voković, whose mission was to carry out special assignments such as sabotage, stationed at the bungalow in Nadioci. Other participants included the Vitezovi, the Viteška brigade of the municipality of Vitez, the Nikola Šubić Zrinski brigade of Busovača, together with Domobrani units (units set up in each village in accordance with a decision from Mostar dated 8 February 1993) stationed at Ahmići, Šantići, Pirići and Nadioci. Many witnesses in the Blaškić case also referred to soldiers in camouflage uniforms being present, wearing the emblem of the Croatian Army. Several Croat inhabitants of these villages also participated in the attack. They were members of the Domobrani such as Slavko Miličević for the Donji Ahmići sector, Žarko Papić for the Zume area, Branko Perković in Nadioci, Zoran Kupreškić in Grabovi (an area in the centre of Ahmići), Nenad Šantić and Colic in Šantići.

==== Denial ====
After the massacre, Croat leaders, supported by propaganda efforts, tried to deny the massacre or to blame other sides in the Bosnian War. Dario Kordić denied to Payam Akhavan, an investigator with the United Nations Centre for Human Rights, that the HVO were involved in the Ahmići massacre; indeed, he said that his men, as good Christians, would never commit such acts and blamed the Serbs or the Muslims themselves: according to him, no investigation was necessary. A similar response was given by general Tihomir Blaškić to British Colonel Stewart in Kordić's presence.

=== Vitez massacre ===
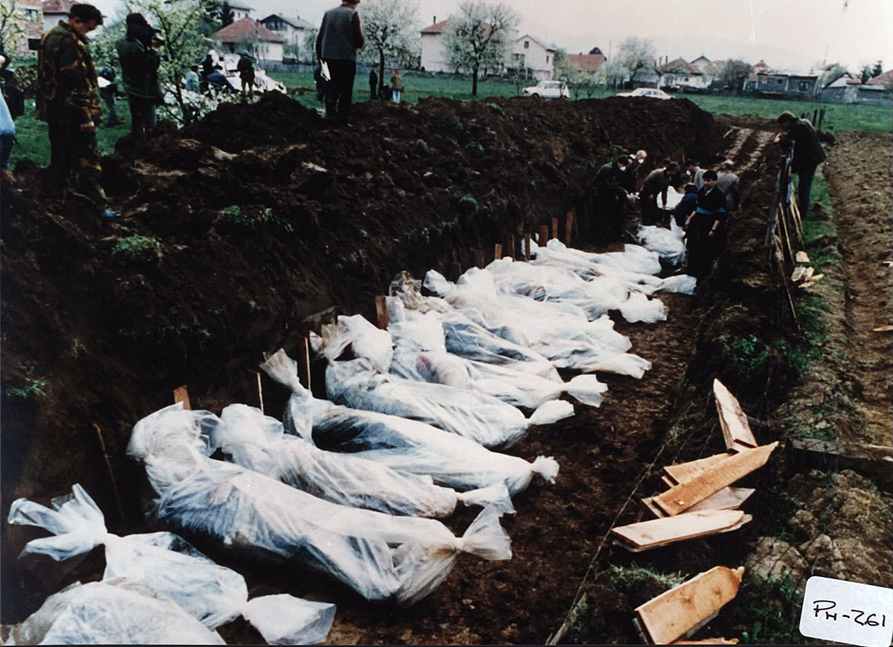
Bodies of people killed in April 1993 around Vitez. (Photograph provided courtesy of the ICTY)

In the early morning of 16 April 1993 at about 5:45 to 6:00 am. Bosniak areas of Vitez and Krušćica were attacked by Croat artillery, which increased during the morning and included mortar fire of various calibre. It was the first coordinated offensive in the area with attacks happening simultaneously up and down the valley. According to professional military opinion of a British colonel, the Army of Bosnia and Herzegovina had been taken by surprise. HVO soldiers in camouflage uniforms entered the streets of Vitez, arresting Bosniaks and killing them in their apartments. The prominent Bosniaks of the town were arrested. Anto Breljaš, a former member of the Vitezovi Unit, said that the Viteška Brigade of HVO and the Vitezovi attacked Stari Vitez but the Vitezovi did not take part in the Ahmići massacre as a unit, although one or two individuals may have done so.

The two villages of Donja Večeriska and Gornja Večeriska near Vitez were attacked on 16 April 1993. On the night of 15 April 1993, most Croats left Donja Večeriska. Nonetheless, an attack was not expected by Bosniaks since the Croats had evacuated the village several times before. The shelling started at 5:30 a.m. with an anti-aircraft gun shooting from the factory nearby. Grenades were thrown into the houses and the residents and others were then arrested and beaten. The majority of Bosniak houses were burned. At least eight persons were killed in the attack and the village was destroyed by explosives and fire.

In all, 172 Bosniaks in the Vitez municipality were killed and 5,000 expelled (1,200 having been detained): 420 buildings were destroyed, together with three mosques, two Muslim seminaries and two schools.

==== Stari Vitez terrorist attack ====
The fighting in Vitez continued after 16 April 1993. The old town of Stari Vitez (or Mahala as it called) remained in Bosnian government hands. However, the HVO surrounded it and subjected it to siege and attack from April 1993 to February 1994. The period was characterized by confrontations of varying intensity, in particular by a violent attack on 18 July 1993 when a great many homemade weapons known as "baby bombs" were fired on Stari Vitez and killed many Bosniaks. That quarter of the town was also targeted by multi-tube rocket-launchers and mortars.

On 18 April 1993 a tanker containing 500 kilograms of explosives exploded near the mosque in Stari Vitez, destroying the offices of the Bosnian War Presidency, killing at least six people and injuring 50 others. The ICTY accepted that this action was a piece of pure terrorism committed by elements within the Croat forces, as an attack on the Bosniak population of Stari Vitez.

=== Busovača villages ===
The villages of Lončari, Merdani and Putiš are in the area to the east of Ahmići and north of Busovača. After the attacks on the villages in January 1993, a significant number of the civilian population went to Zenica but, over the weeks and months that followed, many of them moved back. The villages were then attacked by the HVO in April. The nearby village of Putiš had been attacked on 15 April. In the afternoon of 16 April 1993 masked Croat soldiers attacked the village of Očehnići by firing incendiary bullets into the houses. Within half an hour all the Bosniak houses were burning. The villagers were unarmed and did not put up any resistance. According to witnesses, Paško Ljubičić, later accused of war crimes by ICTY, was the leader of the unit that had attacked the village and that he had been ordered to do so by brigadier Duško Grubešić, commander of the Zrinski Brigade of HVO, to "cleanse Muslims" from the area. Around twenty men from Lončari were detained and taken to Kaonik on 16 April 1993. Upon arrival they were lined up and their valuables were stolen by HVO soldiers.

=== Kiseljak villages ===
On 18 April 1993, the Bosniak villages of the Kiseljak municipality came under attack. The background to the attacks was an order by colonel Tihomir Blaškić to an HVO brigade to capture two of the villages where all enemy forces were to be placed under HVO command. The villages of Gomionica, Svinjarevo and Behrići (which were all close to each other and connected by the main road) were attacked by the HVO, together with Rotilj, Gromiljak, Polje Višnjica and other Bosniak villages in this part of the Kiseljak municipality. The Bosniak population of these villages was either killed or expelled, houses and mosques were set on fire and, in Svinjarevo and Gomionica, houses were plundered. In the case of Rotilj the Bosnian Territorial Defence forces (TO) were asked to surrender their guns before the HVO shelled the village. As a result, the lower part of the village was set on fire, twenty houses or barns were destroyed and seven civilians were killed.

The HVO launched its attack on the village of Svinjarevo by firing 60, 80, and 120-millimetre mortars, and anti-aircraft weapons. As soon as the shelling stopped, soldiers from the Bosnian Territorial Defence organised the evacuation of about 200 civilians from the village. The HVO infantry entered Svinjarevo and the neighbouring villages of Rauševac, Puriševo, Japojrevo and Jehovac, torched several houses belonging to Bosnian Muslims and killed ten civilians. The soldiers also took civilians to the Kiseljak barracks where they were imprisoned for several weeks. The attacks carried on until 23 April 1993.

When ECMM monitors visited the villages they found almost all the Bosnian Muslims had left, their houses had been burned and they concluded that ethnic cleansing had taken place in the area. The ICTY found that Dario Kordić was involved in these attacks in a municipality about 25 kilometers from Busovača. The attacks occurred two days after the attacks on the Bosniak villages of the Lašva Valley and were part of the pattern of attacks on the Bosnian Muslims of Central Bosnia. Blaškić would not have launched the attacks without political approval which meant the approval of the local leadership in the person of Dario Kordić.

=== Zenica massacre ===
The ICTY accepted that the marketplace in Zenica was shelled by HVO on 19 April 1993 from the village of Putičevo, 15 kilometres from Zenica, killing 15 people and injuring another 50. The shells landed in three groups of two, at 12:10 p.m., 12:24 p.m. and 12:29 p.m. Two pieces of artillery were used: D-30 J Howitzers which are hand-loaded and which have a slow rate of fire. It was a professional piece of artillery work with the fire being adjusted by an observer. Two Danish members of the ECMM visited the scene shortly after the shelling and took photographs. These photographs show scenes of devastation in the market area, bodies lying on the ground, destroyed cars, a demolished bus shelter and damaged buildings. Croats blamed Serbs for the massacre, but ICTY discarded such claims during the Dario Kordić trial.

=== Ceasefire ===
On 18 April, Tihomir Blaškić ordered Stjepan Tuka, a moderate HVO officer and commander in Fojnica, to attack Dusina. Tuka, however, did not carry out the order as he hoped for an agreement and followed a policy of compromise in Fojnica where peace had been maintained. The result was his dismissal, despite protests from the local HVO and other organizations.

On 19 April, the ECMM reported a sharp deterioration of the situation in Central Bosnia, a possible explanation being the suspected aim of the Croats to take over the territory of the two provinces while the world's attention was focused on Srebrenica. On 20 April, Gaćice, a village to the south-east of Stari Vitez, was attacked by the HVO and soon after that the duty officer of the Viteška Brigade reported that the "village of Gaćice has been 70 per cent done" and would probably be under control by the end of the day.

Under the chairmanship of the ECMM, on 21 April 1993 negotiations took place between the Croatian Defence Council and Bosnian Army with the aim of securing a cessation of the fighting and separation of the forces. On 25 April 1993, at a meeting in Zagreb, between President Izetbegović and Mate Boban, an agreement for an immediate ceasefire was reached.

== Camps ==
The ICTY Trial Chamber in the Kordić and Čerkez case found that Bosniaks were systematically subjected to arbitrary imprisonment for which there was no justification. The assertion that they were detained for security reasons, or for their own safety, was found to be without foundation. While detained, Bosniaks were subjected to conditions which varied from camp to camp, but which were generally inhuman. The detainees were, without any justification, used as hostages and human shields, and forced to dig trenches. As a result of the latter activity, a number were killed or wounded.

=== Kaonik camp ===
Kaonik camp was located five kilometres north of Busovača. Bosniak civilians and members of Bosnian Territorial Defence were detained in the camp on two occasions: first, after the Croatian Defence Council attack on the municipality in January 1993 and, secondly, after the attacks in the Lašva Valley in April 1993. In January several hundred Bosniak men were detained. In May 1993, 79 detainees were listed. Conditions in the camp were atrocious. The cells were small and over-crowded, hygiene was very poor and the food was inadequate. The detainees were subjected to beatings. Sounds of screams were played on the loudspeakers at night. HVO forced detainees from Kaonik to dig trenches at various places. According to a witness, 26 of those taken during his time did not return.

=== Vitez detention facilities ===
The Vitez Cinema is part of a complex variously called "the Cinema", "Cultural Centre" or "Workers’ University". During the war, this complex housed the headquarters of the Viteška Brigade. Parts of it (first the basement, then the cinema hall) were also used after 16 April 1993, for the detention of some 200–300 Bosniak men of all ages, who had been rounded up. The complex was guarded by HVO soldiers in uniform, some being members of the military police. Prisoners were beaten during their stay and taken out to dig trenches and some did not return.

A detention centre was also established in Vitez Veterinary Station and was used for the first few days of the conflict in Vitez. There were about 40 Bosniaks detained in the basement and around 70 people were detained in total: the guards did not provide the detainees with any food but the detainees’ families could bring food for them. The detainees were taken to dig trenches at Krušćica, where two were killed.

Dubravica Elementary School was an important centre for the detention of over 300 Bosniaks by the HVO between 16 and 30 April 1993. Some were killed and others wounded, while some suffered physical mistreatment and humiliation while digging trenches. Anto Breljaš, a Croat soldier confirmed as a witness in the Kordić trial, said that there were about 350 Bosniak prisoners (men, women and children) in the school. Women and children were separated from the men. The former were kept in the classrooms and the latter in the gymnasium. Military prisoners were kept in the basement and 15 of them were killed. In the gymnasium there was not enough air; there was inadequate food and no medical treatment. The detainees were mistreated and would be used as human shields and for trench-digging in the area near the school and Kula. This all led the witness to protest against the mistreatment of prisoners.

== Individual war crimes trials ==
Accused by the International Criminal Tribunal for the former Yugoslavia:

- Zlatko Aleksovski (7 years in prison)
- Tihomir Blaškić (45 years in prison, later resentenced to 9 years)
- Miroslav Bralo (20 years in prison)
- Mario Čerkez (6 years in prison)
- Anto Furundžija (10 years in prison)
- Drago Josipović (15 years in prison, reduced to 12 years on appeal)
- Dario Kordić (25 years in prison)
- Zoran Kupreškić (10 years in prison, later acquitted on appeal)
- Mirjan Kupreškić (8 years in prison, later acquitted on appeal)
- Vlatko Kupreškić (acquitted)
- Paško Ljubičić (10 years in prison)
- Zoran Marinić (indictment withdrawn)
- Dragan Papić (acquitted)
- Pero Skopljak (indictment withdrawn)
- Ivan Šantić (indictment withdrawn)
- Vladimir Šantić (25 years in prison, reduced to 18 years on appeal)

Accused by the Court of Bosnia and Herzegovina:

- Paško Ljubičić (10 years in prison)
- Krešo Lučić (6 years in prison, (Kreševo events during Lašva Valley ethnic cleansing in April 1993 as a part of widespread and systematic attack against Bosniak civilian population)
