= Dario Kordić =

Bosnian war criminal, former politician, and military commander

Vice president of Herzeg Bosnia
- In office 18 November 1991 – 14 August 1996
- President: Mate Boban; Krešimir Zubak
- Preceded by: Office established
- Succeeded by: Office abolished
Additional positions
President of the Croatian Democratic Union
In office 10 July 1994 – 2 December 1995
Preceded by	Mate Boban
Succeeded by	Božo Rajić
Commander of the Croatian Defence Council
In office 1992–1994
Prime Minister	Jadranko Prlić

Personal details
- Born: 14 December 1960 (age 65) Sarajevo, PR Bosnia and Herzegovina, FPR Yugoslavia
- Party: HDZ BiH
- Spouse: Venera Kordić
- Children: 3
- Education: University of Sarajevo

Dario Kordić (born 14 December 1960) is a Bosnian Croat war criminal and military commander of the Croatian Defence Council (HVO) between 1992 and 1994, vice president of the Croatian Republic of Herzeg-Bosnia, a self-proclaimed Croat territory in Bosnia and Herzegovina. He was sentenced to 25 years in prison in February 2001 for war crimes committed against the Bosniak population during the 1992–94 Bosniak-Croat war, and was released in June 2014 after having served two thirds of his sentence.

== Early life ==
Kordić was born on 14 December 1960 in Sarajevo, PR Bosnia and Herzegovina, FPR Yugoslavia. He studied political science at the University of Sarajevo and then went into journalism working for the Vatrostalac factory newspaper in Busovača.

Although born in Sarajevo, he lived mostly in Busovača. He has three children, a son and two daughters.

== Bosnian War ==
On 12 November 1991, Mate Boban and Kordić held the Joint Meeting of the Crisis Staffs of Herzegovina and Travnik Regional Communities. The two communities decided that Croats in Bosnia and Herzegovina should institute a policy to bring about "our age-old dream, a common Croatian State" and should call for a proclamation of a Croatian banovina in Bosnia and Herzegovina as the "initial phase leading towards the final solution of the Croatian question and the creation of sovereign Croatia within its ethnic and historical borders".

On 27 December 1991 there was a meeting in Zagreb, chaired by President Franjo Tuđman, of the leadership of the Croatian HDZ and of the HDZ BiH. The purpose was, first, to discuss the future of Bosnia and Herzegovina and the differences of opinion on this topic in the HDZ BiH party; secondly, to formulate an overall Croatian political strategy. Stjepan Kljuić set out his position in favour of the Croats remaining within Bosnia and Herzegovina but Boban said that, should Bosnia and Herzegovina disintegrate, the HZ H-B would be proclaimed as independent Croatian territory “which will accede to the State of Croatia but only at such time as the Croatian leadership [...] should decide”. Kordić said the Croatian spirit in the HZ H-B had grown stronger in the 40 days since the declaration of the HZ H-B, the Croatian people of the Travnik region were ready to accede to the Croatian state "at all costs [...] any other option would be considered treason, save the clear demarcation of Croatian soil in the territory of Herceg Bosna".

On 16 January 1992 a rally was held in the municipal hall in Busovača to celebrate Croatian independence, a video recording of which was shown to the Trial Chamber. Kordić was seen speaking to a cheering, flag-waving crowd. He said that the rally was proof that the Croatian people in Busovača are part of the united Croatian nation and that the HZ H-B, including Busovača, is "Croatian land and that is how it will be". Secretary of the Croatian Republic of Herzeg-Bosnia Ignac Koštroman spoke and said: “we will be an integral part of our dear State of Croatia by hook or by crook”. The speeches were met with yells of "Dario, Dario".

The Croatian Democratic Union (HDZ) was one of the principal political parties in Croatia. One of its main aims was to ensure an “entire Croatian Nation to within its historical and natural boundaries”. The Croatian Democratic Union of Bosnia and Herzegovina (HDZ-BiH) was one of the principal political parties of the Bosnian Croatians in Bosnia-Herzegovina, and amongst the avowed aims of the HDZ-BiH figured the statement on the right of the Croats to defend themselves and to secede. The Croatian Republic of Herzeg-Bosnia (HZ H-B/HR H-B) proclaimed its existence in November 1991, defining itself as a separate or distinct entity within the territory of Bosnia-Herzegovina. The Croatian Defence Council (HVO) became the executive, administrative and supreme military organ of the HZ H-B/HR H-B after its creation in April 1992.

Although he was not at the top of the political hierarchy, and was a civilian unused to the official command structure of the HVO, Kordić made many political and strategic decisions; he negotiated cease fire agreements and, he issued orders of direct and indirect military significance. Kordić played a key role in the planning, organisation, promotion and implementation of a politico-military campaign of persecution against the Bosniaks, especially in the Lašva Valley (attack and massacres in Ahmići and other villages in the valley in April 1993), as well as in Zenica.

== War crimes ==
Kordić, like many of the Herzeg-Bosnia leadership and military commanders, was accused of war crimes committed on the Bosniak population. On 6 October 1997, he voluntarily surrendered to the tribunal and on 8 October, pleaded not guilty.

He was accused by the Hague for his role in the Lašva Valley massacre, including Ahmići, where HVO forces committed crimes against the local Bosniak population under his command. There were also reports that HVO soldiers, under his command, committed atrocities in and around Zenica. On 26 February 2001, Kordić was sentenced to 25 years in prison.

Based on his individual criminal responsibility (Art. 7 § 1 ICTY Statute) he was indicted on the following counts:

- Serious violations of the Geneva Conventions (Art. 2 ICTY Statute: willful murder; inhumane treatment, illegal detention of civilians);
- Violations of the laws and customs of war (Art. 3 ICTY Statute: unlawful attack on civilians, the unlawful attack against civilian targets; destruction without justifiable military cause; deliberate destruction or damage to buildings dedicated to religion or education);
- Crimes against humanity (Art. 5 ICTY Statute: persecutions for political or religious reasons; murder; inhumane acts; imprisonment).

In June 2006, he was transferred to a prison in Austria to serve the remainder of his sentence there. In May 2010, his application for early release after having served half of his sentence was denied on grounds of the seriousness of the crimes committed and three disciplinary breaches while in prison. However, on 21 May 2014, Kordić was granted early release, effective 6 June 2014. Čerkez had been sentenced to six years imprisonment, and, having served more than that amount of time in detention, was released for time served.

== See also ==
- Lašva Valley ethnic cleansing
- Joint criminal enterprise

Party political offices
Preceded by Mate Boban	President of the Croatian Democratic Union; 1994–1995	Succeeded by Božo Rajić
