= Croatian Defence Council =

1992–1996 military of the Croatian Republic of Herzeg-Bosnia

- Hrvatsko vijeće obrane
- Leaders: Milivoj Petković; Bruno Stojić; Vladimir Šoljić; Slobodan Praljak; Ante Roso; Tihomir Blaškić
- Dates active: 1992–1997
- Allegiance: Croatian Republic of Herzeg-Bosnia
- Headquarters: Mostar
- Size: 50,000 (1995)
- Wars: Croatian War of Independence; Bosnian War; Croat–Bosniak War

The Croatian Defence Council (Croatian: Hrvatsko vijeće obrane, HVO) was the armed wing of Croatian Republic of Herzeg-Bosnia. It existed in the Republic of Bosnia and Herzegovina between 1991 and 1997. The HVO was the main military force of the Croats of Bosnia and Herzegovina.

In the initial stage of the Bosnian War, the HVO fought alongside the Army of the Republic of Bosnia and Herzegovina (ARBiH) against the Army of Republika Srpska, but in the latter stage of the conflict clashed against the ARBiH, particularly in the Mostar area. The European Community Monitoring Mission estimated the strength of the HVO in the beginning of 1993 at 45,000–55,000. In July 1993, the Central Intelligence Agency estimated the HVO forces at 40,000 to 50,000 men.

The HVO was incorporated into the Army of the Federation of Bosnia and Herzegovina (VFBiH) in December 1997 by following the agreement made after signing the Dayton Accords. In December 2005, the HVO was reorganised as the 1st Infantry Guard Regiment of the Armed Forces of Bosnia and Herzegovina, after VFBiH and Army of Republika Srpska were united into a single armed force.

== History ==
The HVO was established on 8 April 1992 in Grude by the political leadership of the Croatian Republic of Herzeg-Bosnia, primarily members of the Croatian Democratic Union of Bosnia and Herzegovina (HDZ-BiH), to serve as the supreme defence body for the region. Its formation followed the October 1991 destruction of the village of Ravno by the Yugoslav People's Army, an event which prompted local Croat leaders to organize for self-defense amid the perceived inability of the central government in Sarajevo to provide security. Initially envisioned as a temporary expedient to defend Croat-populated territories until a national defense could be organized, the HVO grew rapidly, with a sizable number of Bosniaks initially joining its ranks. On 15 May 1992, the HVO Department of Defence was established, followed by the formation of the HVO Main Staff, Main Logistics Base, Military Police, and Personnel Administration.

Armed conflict erupted between Herzeg-Bosnia (with Croatian support) and the Republic of Bosnia and Herzegovina, following a shift by the HVO toward territorial expansion and the establishment of Croat-controlled areas, often accompanied by displacement and violence against non-Croat populations. However, in Bihać, and Usora, the HVO and ARBiH still worked together. In March 1994, the Washington Agreement was signed, which ended fighting between the HVO and ARBiH.

== Commanders ==
- April 1992 – July 1993, Brigadier general Milivoj Petković;
- July – November 1993, Mayor general Slobodan Praljak;
- November 1993 – April 1994, Lieutenant general Ante Roso;
- April 1994 – August 1994, Major general Milivoj Petković;
- August 1994 – November 1995, Major general Tihomir Blaškić

== Organization ==
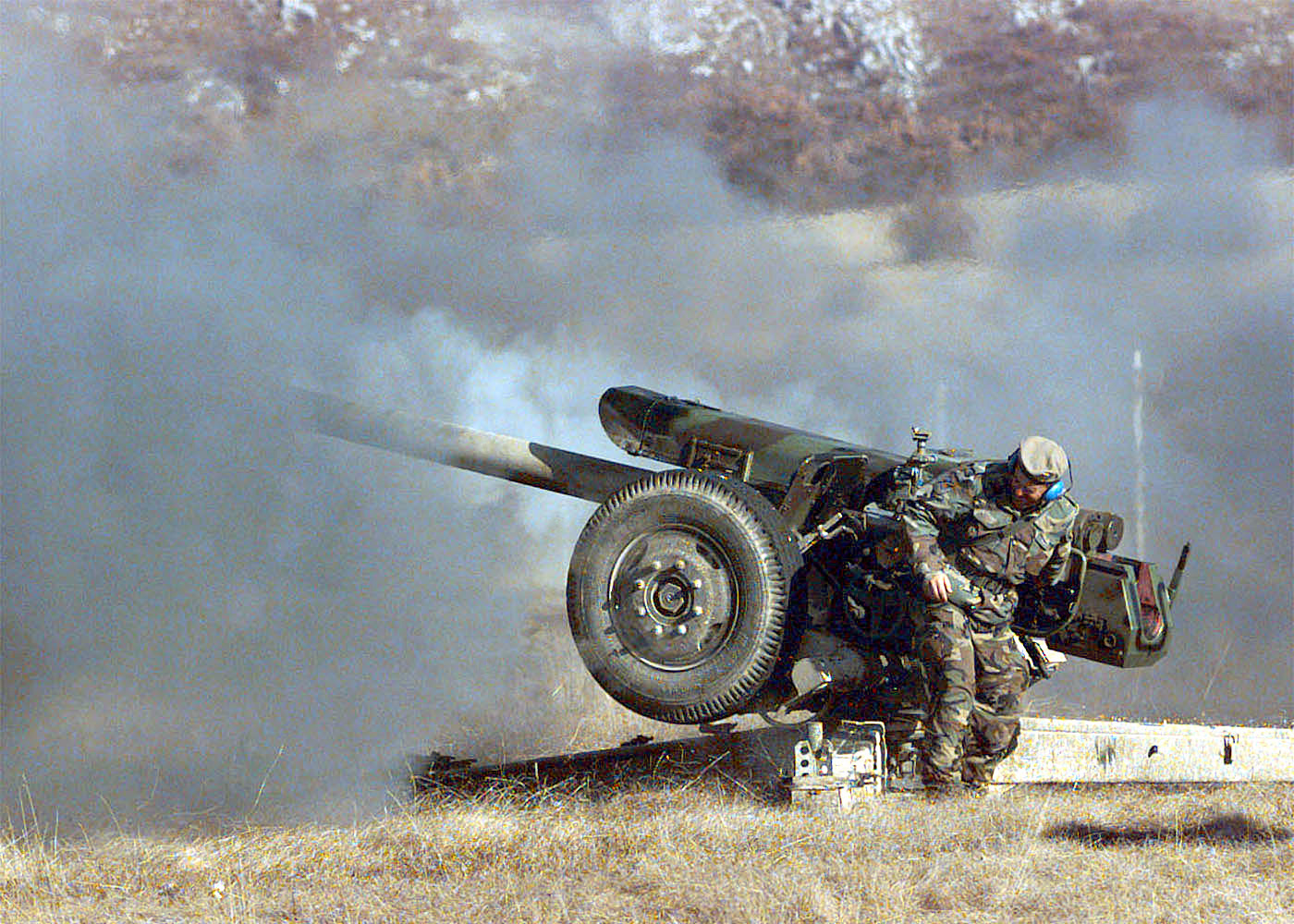
HVO 122mm Howitzer D-30J during an exercise

The main HVO headquarters was located in Mostar, and was divided into four corps-status operational zones: South-Eastern Herzegovina, North-Western Herzegovina, Central Bosnia, and Bosnian Posavina. In comparison, the first three zones were grouped more or less together, with two enclaves, Usora, which was defended by the 110th Usora Brigade, and Žepče, which was defended by the 111th Žepče XP Brigade, Posavina was completely isolated in northern Bosnia on the right bank of the Sava river around Orašje and was entirely dependent on support from Croatia. There was also the 101st Regiment "Ante Knežević-Krpe" in the Bihać enclave which liaised with the ARBiH 5th Corps. Each OZ controlled 8-14 infantry brigades, a military police battalion and an MP "Light Assault Battalion".

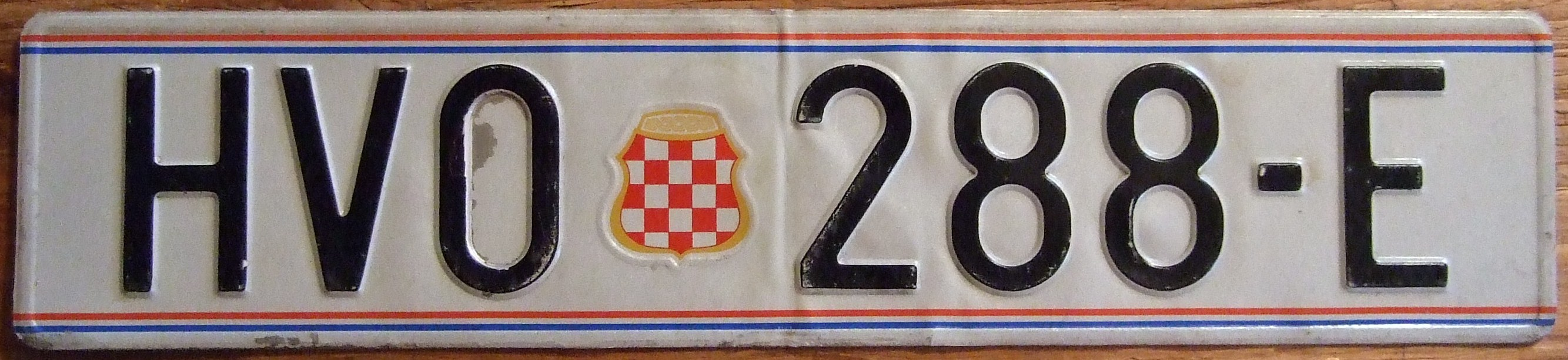
HVO military license plate

The HVO also included the Ante Bruno Bušić Brigade composed of full-time soldiers, two independent infantry battalions, a light anti-aircraft artillery battalion, Special Forces and artillery units. In early 1993, the HVO Home Guard (Croatian: Domobranstvo) was formed to provide support for the brigades. The HVO forces became better organised as time passed, but they started creating guards brigades, mobile units of professional soldiers, only in early 1994.

=== Guard brigades ===
- 1st Guards Brigade "Ante Bruno Bušić"
- 2nd HVO Guards Brigade
- 3rd HVO Guards Brigade "Hawks"
- 4th HVO Guards Brigade "Sons of Posavina"

The Guards brigades were the sections of the HVO which handled its heavy weapons. The HVO had around 50 tanks, 400 artillery pieces, and 200 armoured troop carriers. A brigade numbered a few hundred to several thousand men, but most had 2,000–3,000.

=== Other brigades ===
Reservists staffed 38 infantry brigades, 19 had names and/or numbers, and 19 only had names. The names commemorate famous or infamous figures from Croatian and Bosnian history. Each brigade had three or four battalions plus supporting elements. Two, the 107th and 109th were later transferred en masse to the ARBiH due to their Muslim majorities, as did the Muslim contingent of the 108th Brčko Brigade, who went on to form the ARBiH's 108 Motorised Brigade. The 107th became the ARBiH 107th "Chivalrous" Brigade while the 109th became the 109th Mountain Brigade.

== 1993 restructuring ==
In 1993, General Ante Roso restructured the HVO along the lines of the Croatian Army (HV). The four OZs were designated as Corps Districts Mostar, Tomislavgrad, Vitez and Orašje. Orašje included a much reduced Bosanska Posavina. Four Guards Brigades were formed, each composed of full-time professional soldiers. Twenty-nine brigades were reformed as three-battalion strong Home Defence Regiments, usually with the same name and depot. Four brigades were disbanded. The military police were reduced to one Light Assault Brigade at Mostar.

Eight HVO units served with the ARBiH, while one HVO brigade was forcibly incorporated into the ARBiH. The Sarajevo King Tvrtko Brigade became part of the ARBiH's 1st Corps.

== Equipment ==
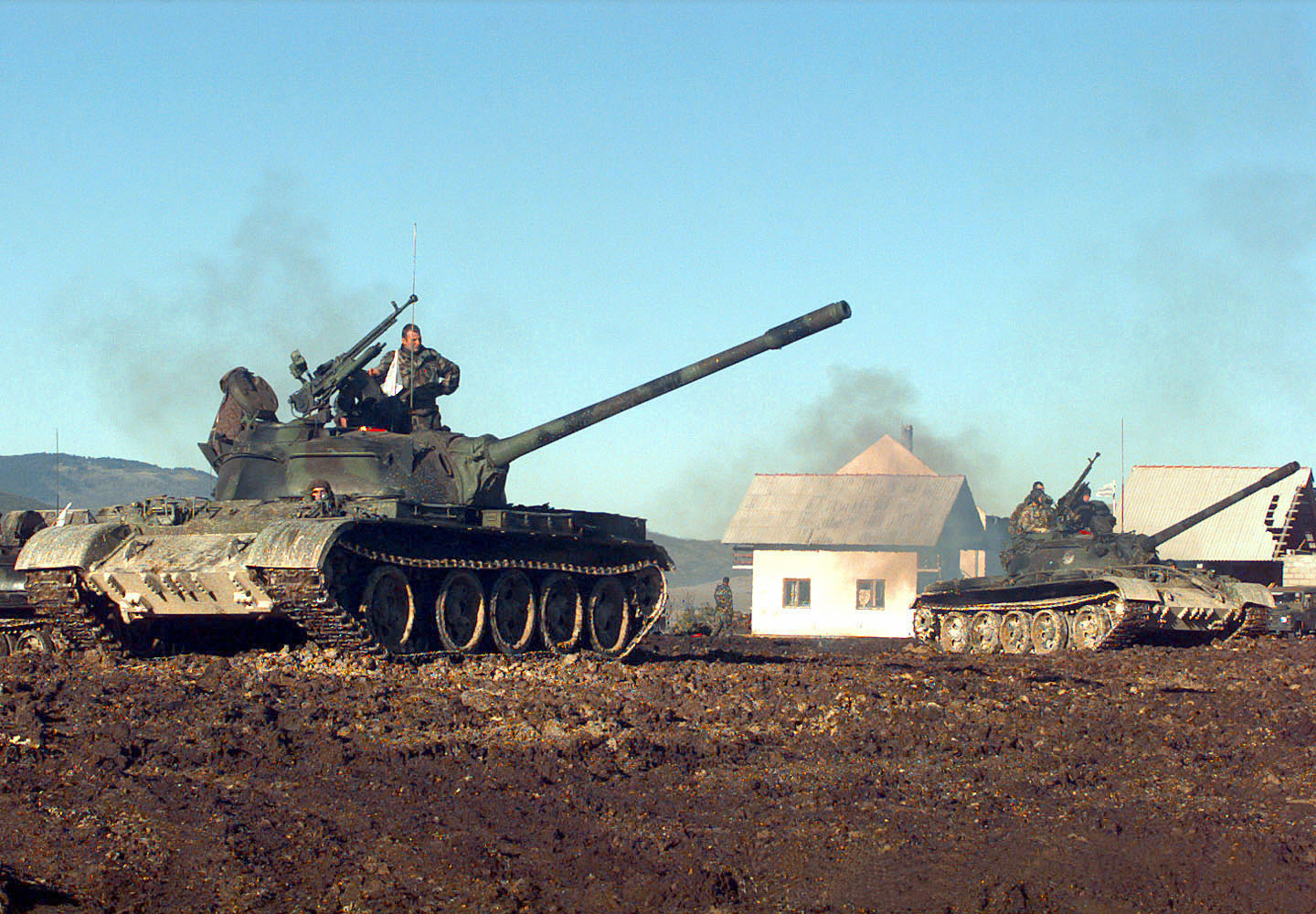
HVO T-55 tanks

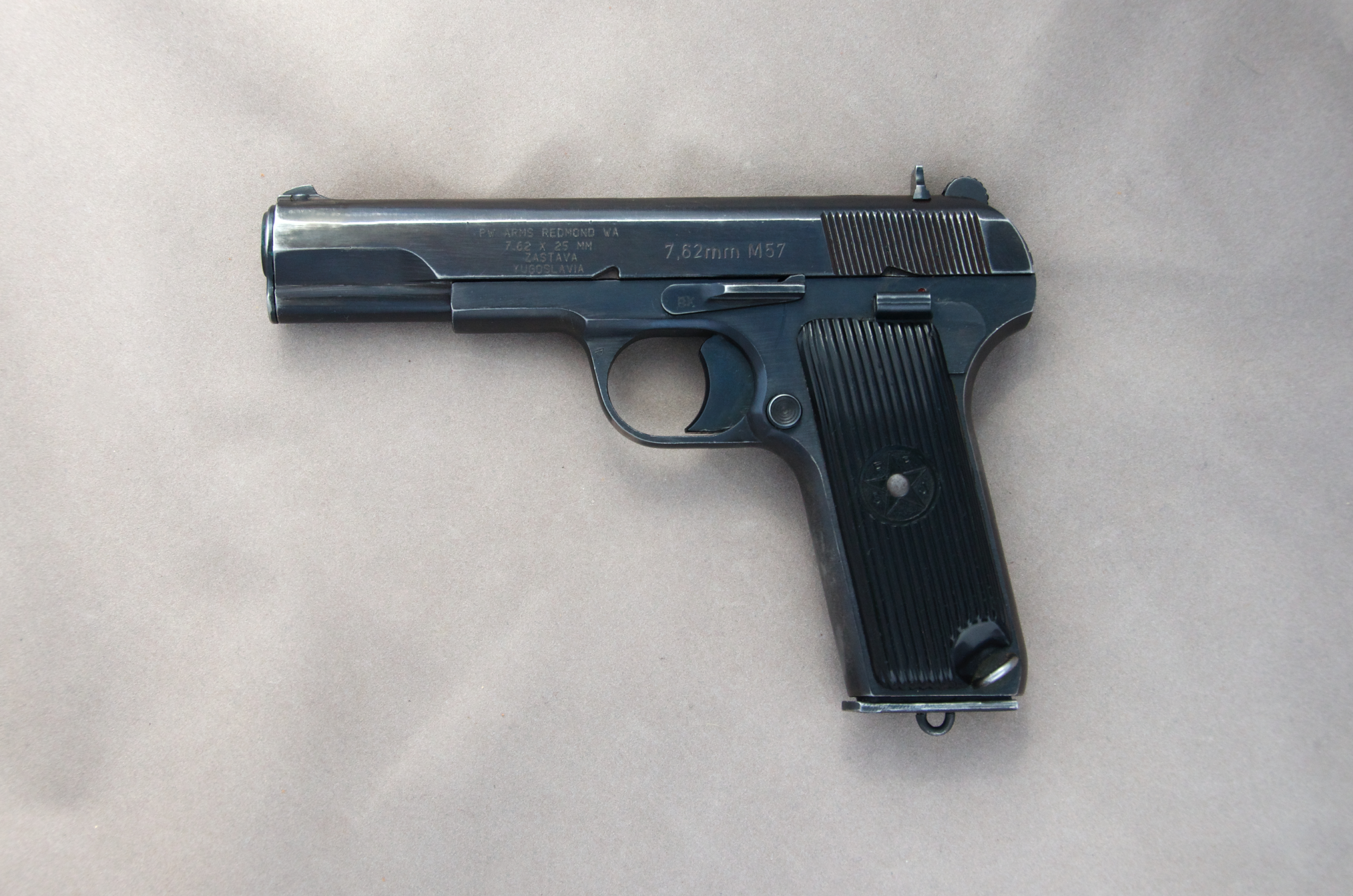
A Zastava M57, used by the HVO

Small arms
Name	Origin	Type
Zastava M57	Yugoslavia	pistol
Strojnica ERO	Croatia	submachine gun
Zastava M70	Yugoslavia	assault rifle

== HVO aviation ==
The HVO Air Forces and Anti-aircraft Artillery was formed in 1992 and consisted of the 11th Combined Squadron, which operated helicopters and transports, and the 121st Observation Squadron, which operated various civilian light aircraft in an observation and communications role. There was also the 14th Anti-aircraft Missile Unit, which operated several different SAM systems.

== See also ==
- Croatian Army
- Croatian Defence Forces
- Roland Bartetzko
