= Karađorđevo =

Karađorđevo can refer to:

- Karađorđevo, Bačka Palanka, a village near Bačka Palanka, Vojvodina, Serbia.
  - Karađorđevo hunting ground, a hunting ground, resort and stud farm
- Karađorđevo, Bačka Topola, a village near Bačka Topola, Vojvodina, Serbia.
- Banatsko Karađorđevo, a village near Žitište, Vojvodina, Serbia.
