= Agreement on Friendship and Cooperation between Bosnia and Herzegovina and Croatia =

Basis for joint defense against Serb forces

- Signed: 21 July 1992
- Location: Zagreb, Croatia
- Signatories: Alija Izetbegović, Franjo Tuđman
- Parties: Bosnia and Herzegovina Croatia

The Agreement on Friendship and Cooperation between Bosnia and Herzegovina and Croatia was signed by Alija Izetbegović, President of the Republic of Bosnia and Herzegovina, and Franjo Tuđman, President of the Republic of Croatia, in Zagreb on 21 July 1992 during the Bosnian and Croatian wars for independence from Yugoslavia. It established cooperation, albeit inharmonious, between the two and served as a basis for joint defense against Serb forces. It also placed the Croatian Defence Council (HVO) under the command of the Army of the Republic of Bosnia and Herzegovina (ARBiH).

The agreement fell apart in October after a number of events including the assassination of Blaž Kraljević, leader of Croatian Defence Forces (HOS) in Bosnia and Herzegovina, the fall of the areas of Posavina, Bosanski Brod, and Jajce into the hands of the Army of Republika Srpska (VRS), and after a major battle broke out between the HVO and the ARBiH in Prozor.

== Preparation for war ==
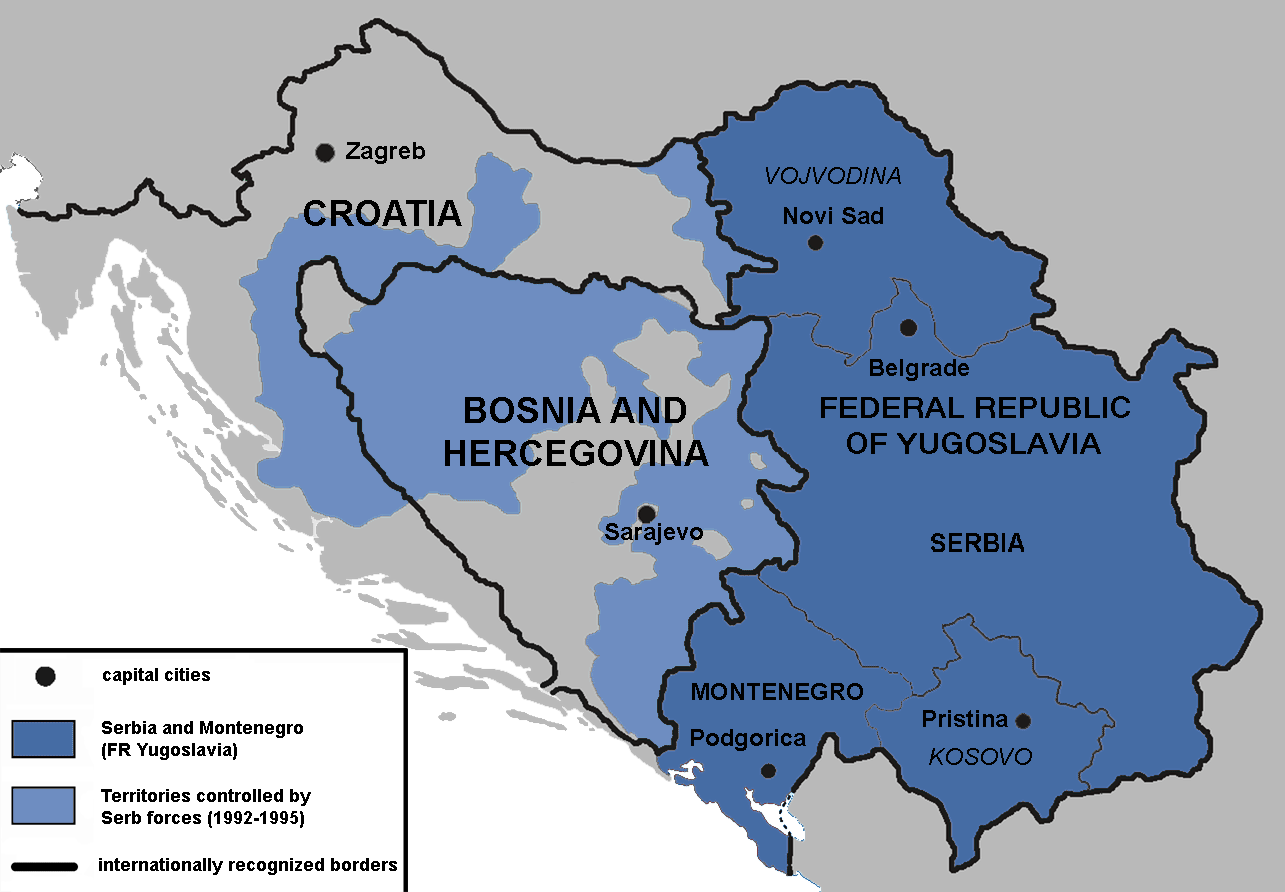
Serb-held territory in the former Yugoslavia, July 1992

In 1990 and 1991, Serbs in Croatia and in Bosnia and Herzegovina had proclaimed a number of "Serbian Autonomous Regions" with the intent of later unifying them to create a Greater Serbia. Serbs used the well equipped Yugoslav People's Army (JNA) in defending these territories. As early as September or October 1990, the JNA had begun arming Bosnian Serbs and organizing them into militias. By March 1991, the JNA had distributed an estimated 51,900 firearms to Serb paramilitaries and 23,298 firearms to Serbian Democratic Party (SDS). The Croatian government began arming Croats in the Herzegovina region in 1991 and in the start of 1992, expecting that the Serbs would spread the war into Bosnia and Herzegovina. It also helped arm the Bosniak community. From July 1991 to January 1992, the JNA and Serb paramilitaries used Bosnian territory to wage attacks on Croatia.

On 25 March 1991, Franjo Tuđman met with Serbian president Slobodan Milošević in Karađorđevo, reportedly to discuss partition of Bosnia and Herzegovina. In November, the autonomous Croatian Community of Herzeg-Bosnia (HZ-HB) was established, it claimed it had no secessionary goal and that it would serve a "legal basis for local self-administration". It vowed to respect the Bosnian government under the condition that Bosnia and Herzegovina was independent of "the former and every kind of future Yugoslavia." In December, Tuđman, in a conversation with Bosnian Croat leaders, said that "from the perspective of sovereignty, Bosnia-Herzegovina has no prospects" and recommended that Croatian policy "support for the sovereignty [of Bosnia and Herzegovina] until such time as it no longer suits Croatia."

In April 1992, the siege of Sarajevo began, by which time the Bosnian Serb-formed Army of Republika Srpska (VRS) controlled 70% of Bosnia and Herzegovina. On 8 April, Bosnian Croats were organized into the Croatian Defence Council (HVO). A sizable number of Bosniaks also joined. The Croatian Defence Forces (HOS), led by Blaž Kraljević in Bosnia and Herzegovina, which "supported Bosnian territorial integrity much more consistently and sincerely than the HVO" was also created. On 15 April 1992, the multi-ethnic Army of the Republic of Bosnia and Herzegovina (ARBiH) was formed, with slightly over two-thirds of troops consisting of Bosniaks and almost one-third of Croats and Serbs. In the winter Bosniaks began leaving the HVO and joining the ARBiH which also began receiving supplies from Croatia. In May, HVO Major General Ante Roso declared that the only "legal military force" in HZ-HB was the HVO and that "all orders from the TO [Territorial Defense] command [of Bosnia and Herzegovina] are invalid, and are to be considered illegal on this territory".

== Pressure and agreement ==
The Croatian government played a "double game" in Bosnia and Herzegovina and "a military solution required Bosnia as an ally, but a diplomatic solution required Bosnia as a victim". Tuđman's Croatian Democratic Union (HDZ) party held important positions in the Bosnian government including the premiership and the ministry of defence, but despite this carried out a separate policy and refused for the HVO to be integrated into ARBiH. Jerko Doko, the Bosnian defence minister, gave the HVO priority in the acquisition of military weapons. In January 1992, Tuđman had arranged for Stjepan Kljuić, president of the Croatian Democratic Union of Bosnia and Herzegovina (HDZ BiH) who favored cooperating with the Bosniaks towards a unified Bosnian state, to be ousted and replaced by Mate Boban, who favored Croatia to annex Croat-inhabited parts of Bosnia and Herzegovina. A rift existed in the party between Croats from ethnically mixed areas of central and northern Bosnia and those from Herzegovina. Milivoj Gagro, prewar Croat mayor of Mostar and ally of Kljuić said: "The secessionist policy [union with Croatia] was consistently supported by the Herzegovina side, not by Sarajevo, Posavina, or Central Bosnia Croats. [...] Croats from Central Bosnia and Posavina, as well as those from urban centers who lived with Muslims and Serbs, thought differently. But when the war picked up, Posavina Croats were attacked, Sarajevo was surrounded [...] Kljuić was sidelined and Boban came in with idea [the Croat separatist idea] in this area. [...] When they [Croats in Sarajevo as well as Northern and Central Bosnia] felt they could not survive any more they lifted their hands and accepted their fate. And the Herzegovina Croats promised them the stars in the sky and told them "come here and we will give you a place." And what happened? It resulted in an exodus. And all these miserable Croat refugee communities that look absolutely ugly."

Izetbegović came under intense pressure from Tuđman to agree for Bosnia and Herzegovina to be in a confederation with Croatia; however, Izetbegović wanted to prevent Bosnia and Herzegovina from coming under the influence of Croatia or Serbia. Because doing so would cripple reconciliation between Bosniaks and Serbs, make the return of Bosniak refugees to eastern Bosnia impossible and for other reasons, Izetbegović opposed. He received an ultimatum from Boban warning that if he did not proclaim a confederation with Tuđman that Croatian forces would not help defend Sarajevo from strongholds as close as 40 kilometres (25 mi) away. On 9 May, Boban, Josip Manolić, Tuđman's aide and previously the Croatian Prime Minister, and Radovan Karadžić, president of the self-proclaimed Republika Srpska, secretly met in Graz and formed an agreement on the division of Bosnia and Herzegovina, the Graz agreement. Beginning in June, discussions between Bosniaks and Croats over military cooperation and possible merger of their armies started to take place. The Croatian government recommended moving ARBiH headquarters out of Sarajevo and closer to Croatia and pushed for its reorganization in an effort to heavily add Croatian influence.

In June and July, Boban increased pressure "by blocking delivery of arms that the Sarajevo government, working around a United Nations embargo on all shipments to the former Yugoslavia, has secretly bought." On 3 July, Boban declared the independence of the Croatian Republic of Herzeg-Bosnia (HR-HB). He was established as its president. It claimed power over its own police, army, currency, and education and extended its grasp to many districts where Bosniaks were the majority. It only allowed a Croat flag to be used, the only currency allowed was the Croatian kuna, its only official language was Croatian, and a Croat school curriculum was enacted. Mostar, a town where Bosniaks constituted a slight majority, was set as the capital. There was no mention on the defense of Bosnia and Herzegovina's territorial integrity.

On 21 July, Izetbegović and Tuđman signed the "Agreement on Friendship and Cooperation between the Republic of Bosnia and Herzegovina and the Republic of Croatia" in Zagreb, Croatia. The agreement allowed them to "cooperate in opposing [the Serb] aggression" and coordinate military efforts. It placed the HVO under the command of the ARBiH. Cooperation was inharmonious, but enabled the transportation of weapons to ARBiH through Croatia in spite of the UN sanctioned arms embargo, reopening channels blocked by Boban. It established "economic, financial, cultural, educational, scientific and religious cooperation" between the signatories. It also stipulated that Bosnian Croats hold dual citizenship for both Bosnia and Herzegovina and for Croatia. This was criticized as Croatian attempts at "claiming broader political and territorial rights in the parts of Bosnia and Herzegovina where large numbers of Croats live". After its signature Boban vowed to Izetbegović that HR-HB would remain an integral part of Bosnia and Herzegovina when the war ended.

== Aftermath ==
"HOS, as a regular army in Bosnia-Herzegovina, will fight for the freedom and sovereignty of Bosnia-Herzegovina because it is our homeland [and will] not allow any divisions."

— Blaž Kraljević during a ceremony in Čapljina on 19 July 1992

In the summer of 1992, the HVO started to purge its Bosniak members. At the same time armed incidents started to occur among Croats in Bosnia and Herzegovina between the HVO and the HOS. The HOS was loyal to the Bosnian government and accepted subordination to the Staff of the ARBiH of which Kraljević was appointed a member. On 9 August, Kraljević and eight of his staff were assassinated by HVO soldiers under the command of Mladen Naletilić, who supported a split between Croat and Bosniaks, after Kraljević's HOS attacked the VRS near Trebinje. The HOS's advance into eastern Herzegovina and occupation of Trebinje angered Boban who had affirmed to Karadžić that Croat forces were uninterested in the region. The HOS was disbanded, leaving the HVO as the only Croat force. Bosnian officials suspected that Tuđman's government was involved. According to Manolić the order to kill Kraljević was given by Šušak and approved by Tuđman. Božidar Vučurević, the war-time mayor of Trebinje, stated he safeguarded records showing that SDS and HDZ figures considered it a "task" that need to be carried out.

In late September, Izetbegović and Tuđman met again and attempted to create military coordination against the VRS, but to no avail. By October, the agreement had collapsed and afterwards Croatia diverted delivery of weaponry to Bosnia and Herzegovina by seizing a significant amount for itself. Boban had abandoned a Bosnian government alliance and ceased all hostilities with Karadžić. The dominant Croatian–Bosnian defense of Posavina fell apart after Tuđman and/or Gojko Šušak ordered the withdrawal of the Croatian Army (HV), enabling the Serbs to gain control of the corridor and connect their captured territories in western and eastern Bosnia. On 8 October, the town of Bosanski Brod was abandoned by the HVO and left to the VRS. By that time, the HV and the HVO had sustained approximately 7,500 casualties, out of 20,000 troops committed to the battle to control Posavina. The pullout appeared to be a quid pro quo for the JNA withdrawal from Dubrovnik's hinterland that took place in July. Still, a Central Intelligence Agency analysis concluded that there is no direct evidence of such arrangements. On 9 October, the HVO signed a cease-fire with the VRS in Jajce in exchange for providing electricity.

The strained relations escalated rapidly and led to an armed clash between the two forces in Novi Travnik on 18 October. Low-scale conflicts spread in the region, and the two forces engaged each other along the supply route to Jajce three days later, on 21 October, as a result of an ARBiH roadblock set up the previous day on authority of the "Coordinating Committee for the Protection of Muslims" rather than the ARBiH command. Just as the roadblock was dismantled, a new skirmish occurred in the town of Vitez the following day. On 29 October, the VRS captured Jajce due to the inability of ARBiH and HVO forces to construct a cooperative defense, against the VRS which held the advantage in troop size and firepower, staff work and planning was significantly superior to the defenders of Jajce. Six days prior the first major battle in the impending Croat–Bosniak war broke out when the HVO pushed ARBiH from Prozor and expelled the Bosniak population after carrying out rapes, attacking the local mosque, and torching the property of Bosniaks. Initial reports indicated about 300 Bosniaks were killed or wounded in the attack, but subsequent reports by the ARBiH made in November 1992 indicated eleven soldiers and three civilians were killed. Another ARBiH report, prepared in March 1993, revised the numbers saying eight civilians and three ARBiH soldiers were killed, while 13 troops and 10 civilians were wounded.

== See also ==
- Washington Agreement
- Split Agreement
- Bosnia and Herzegovina–Croatia relations
