= Division of Bosnia and Herzegovina =

Division of Bosnia and Herzegovina may refer to:

- Political divisions of Bosnia and Herzegovina
- Partition of Bosnia and Herzegovina
