= Karađorđevo, Bačka Palanka =

Karađorđevo Карађорђево (Serbian)
- Village (Selo)
- Windmill in Karađorđevo
- Interactive map of Karađorđevo
- Location within Vojvodina Location within Serbia Location within Europe
- Coordinates: 45°17′30.07″N 19°18′11.83″E
- Country: Serbia
- Province: Vojvodina
- Region: Bačka (Podunavlje)
- District: South Bačka
- Municipality: Bačka Palanka
- Time zone: UTC+1 (CET)
  - Summer (DST): UTC+2 (CEST)

Karađorđevo (Serbian Cyrillic: Карађорђево) is a village in the Bačka Palanka municipality, in the South Bačka District of Serbia. Karađorđevo had a total population of 1,077 inhabitants in 1991 and 1,012 inhabitants in 2002. It is located 10 km north west of the municipality centre.

The Karađorđevo estate, established in 1885, has served as a representative hunting resorts for kings, nobility and statesmen. It is managed by the Karađorđevo Military Establishment. One part of the property is a special nature reserve.

== History ==
Karađorđevo is the youngest place in municipality. It was founded as a horse farm called Mentelep by Hungarians in 1904. It became Agricultural property in 1946 and workers started settling around horse farm and agricultural property and formed three parts of the village: the oldest one, Beli Majur (White Homestead), Gornji Majur (Upper Homestead) and Donji Majur (Lower Homestead). Nearby forest became a hunting ground and president of Yugoslavia Josip Broz Tito had built a residence near the village.

In March 1991, Croatian president Franjo Tuđman and Serbian president Slobodan Milošević held a meeting in Karađorđevo that was controversial because they reportedly discussed the partition of Bosnia and Herzegovina.

== Demographics ==
In the 2002 census, the village had 1,012 inhabitants, including:

- 809 Serbs
- 53 Hungarians
- 34 Yugoslavs
- 31 Croats
- 18 Slovaks

=== Historical population ===
- 1981: 1,147
- 1991: 1,077
- 2002: 1,012

== See also ==
- Bačka Palanka
- South Bačka District
- Bačka
- List of places in Serbia
- List of cities, towns and villages in Vojvodina
