= Bosniak nationalism =

Nationalism of the Bosniak people

Flag of the Republic of Bosnia and Herzegovina, the main national flag of Bosniaks

Bosniak nationalism (Bosnian: bošnjački nacionalizam) or Bosniakdom (Bosnian: bošnjaštvo) is the nationalism that asserts the nationality of Bosniaks and promotes the cultural unity of the Bosniaks. It should not be confused with Bosnian nationalism (Serbo-Croatian: bosanski nacionalizam), often referred to as Bosniandom (Serbo-Croatian: bosanstvo), as Bosniaks are treated as a constituent people by the preamble of Constitution of Bosnia and Herzegovina, whereas people who identify as Bosnians for nationality are not. Bosniaks were formerly called Muslims in census data but this model was last used in the 1991 census.

In both the past and present, Bosniak nationalism has been largely based upon a focus to preserve the territorial integrity of Bosnia and Herzegovina and to ensure the national and cultural unity and rights of Bosniaks.

== History ==
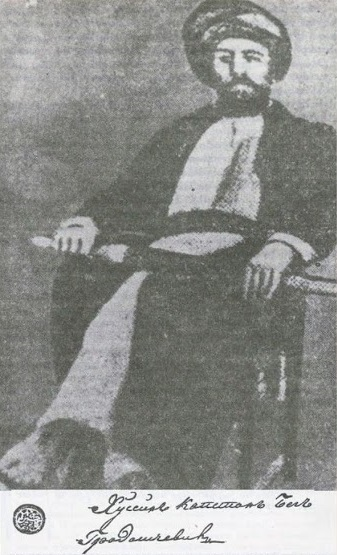
Husein Kapetan Gradaščević, also known as "Zmaj od Bosne" (Dragon of Bosnia) is one of the most important Bosniak national heroes.

The earliest vestige of a Bosnian identity initially emerged in medieval Bosnia and lacked any religious connotation. The situation remained largely unchanged throughout the Ottoman period with terms such as "Boşnaklar", "Boşnak taifesi", "Bosnalı takımı", "Bosnalı kavmi" (all meaning, roughly, "the Bosniak people") being used to describe Bosniaks in a regional sense.

After the Austro-Hungarian occupation of Bosnia and Herzegovina in 1878, the Austrian administration officially endorsed Bošnjaštvo ('Bosniakhood') as the basis of a continued multi-confessional Bosnian nation. The policy aspired to isolate Bosnia and Herzegovina from its irredentist neighbors (Orthodox Serbia, Catholic Croatia, and the Muslims of the Ottoman Empire) and to negate the concept of Croatian and Serbian nationhood which had already begun to make headway among Bosnia and Herzegovina's Catholic and Orthodox communities, respectively. Nevertheless, in part due to the dominant standing held in the previous centuries by the native Muslim population in Ottoman Bosnia, a sense of Bosniak nationhood was cherished mainly by Muslim Bosnians, while fiercely opposed by nationalists from Serbia and Croatia who were instead opting to claim the Bosnian Muslim population as their own, a move that was rejected by most Bosnian Muslims. Austro-Hungarian period witnessed the emergence of Bosniak nationalism. It was in this period that the Bosnian Muslims made political demands in a modern sense. After 1906, the Muslims established several political parties and many institutions and associations which reflected their ethnic and cultural distinctiveness.

In an article of the journal Bošnjak ("The Bosniak"), Bosniak author and mayor of Sarajevo Mehmed Kapetanović declared that Bosnian Muslims were neither Croats nor Serbs but a distinct, though related, people:

Whereas the Croats argue that the Orthodox are our greatest enemies and that Serbdom is the same as Orthodoxy, the Serbs wear themselves out calling our attention to some bogus history, by which they have Serbianized the whole world. We shall never deny that we belong to the South Slav family; but we shall remain Bosniaks, like our forefathers, and nothing else.

— Mehmed Kapetanović, 1891

Upon the founding of Yugoslavia in 1918, Yugoslav unitarists claimed that there was only one single Yugoslav nation and that the Croats, Serbs, and Slovenes were recognized as the "tribes" of the Yugoslavs, this excluded recognition of Bosniaks as a distinct people of Yugoslavia and provoked frustration amongst Bosniaks. In response to a lack of recognition, the Yugoslav Muslim Organization (JMO) was founded in 1919 with support of most Bosniaks and other Slavic Muslims in entire region, including the Muslim intelligentsia and social elite, that sought to defend Bosniak and Muslim identity - including religious, social, and economic rights within Bosnia and Herzegovina. The JMO took part in government briefly in 1928 and then longer from 1935 to 1938 in which it participated in government with the goal of preserving the territorial integrity of Bosnia and Herzegovina in opposition to plans to create an autonomous Croatia that held territory of Bosnia and Herzegovina. The JMO's efforts to prevent the partition of Bosnia and Herzegovina failed and the Banovina of Croatia was created in 1939.

Bosniak nationalism received a severe setback during World War II when Yugoslavia was invaded by the Axis powers and Bosnia and Herzegovina was annexed by the Independent State of Croatia (NDH) that regarded the Bosniaks as "Muslim Croats". By late 1941, much of the Bosniak elite openly criticized the NDH regime for its policy toward its minorities, and demanded autonomy for Bosnia and Herzegovina.

With the creation of Socialist Yugoslavia in 1945, Bosnia and Herzegovina was restored as a territorial entity and as one of the six constituent republics of the federal state of Yugoslavia. To resolve the Serb-Croat dispute over Bosnia and Herzegovina, the Yugoslav government in 1971 recognized Bosnian Muslims as a nationality.

Bosniak nationalism rose in strength since the 1980s, especially following Alija Izetbegović's publishing of the Islamic Declaration that called for an Islamic renewal amongst Bosniaks, Izetbegović was arrested by Yugoslav state authorities in 1983 on allegations that he was promoting a purely Muslim Bosnia, and served five years in prison. In 1990, Izetbegović and others founded the Party of Democratic Action, that became the main Bosniak party in the Bosnian parliament. The eruption of the Bosnian War from 1992 to 1995 strengthened Bosnian Muslim identity. In 1993, "Bosniak" was officially revived as the ethnic or national designation to replace the "Muslim" designation, employed by the Yugoslav authorities.

== See also ==
- Anti-Croat sentiment
- Anti-Serb sentiment
- Rise of nationalism under the Ottoman Empire § Bosniaks
- Bosnian Movement of National Pride
- Greater Bosnia
- Yugoslavism

== Bibliography ==
- Motyl, Alexander J. (2001). Encyclopedia of Nationalism, Volume II. Academic Press. ISBN 0-12-227230-7.
