= Karađorđevo meeting =

Karađorđevo meeting may refer to:

- Milošević–Tuđman Karađorđevo meeting, a 1991 meeting of presidents of SR Serbia and SR Croatia during the breakup of Yugoslavia
- 1971 League of Communists of Yugoslavia Karađorđevo meeting, a meeting of top level Yugoslav communist leadership that led to the end of the Croatian Spring, a political conflict in SR Croatia
