= Graz agreement =

Proposed peace agreement made between Croatia and Serbia during Yugoslav Wars

- Type: Bilateral treaty
- Signed: 6 May 1992
- Location: Graz, Styria, Austria
- Original signatories: Radovan Karadžić; Mate Boban
- Parties: Republika Srpska; Herzeg-Bosnia

The Graz agreement was a proposed agreement made between the Bosnian Serb leader Radovan Karadžić and the Bosnian Croat leader Mate Boban (Note: Mate Boban was the only non-Serb leader to recognize Republika Srpska.) on 6 May 1992 in the city of Graz, Austria. The agreement publicly declared the territorial division between Republika Srpska and the Croatian Community of Herzeg-Bosnia and called for an end of conflicts between Serbs and Croats. The largest group in Bosnia and Herzegovina, the Bosniaks, did not take part in the agreement and were purposefully not invited to the negotiations. (Note: At the time Bosniaks accounted for 44 percent of Bosnia and Herzegovina's 4.4 million population and dominated the current government.)

In their joint statement the Bosnian Croat and Serb leadership described it as a peace agreement. Croatian President Franjo Tuđman, in a letter to United States senator Robert Dole, later presented the agreement as part of a Conference on Bosnia and Herzegovina sponsored by the European Community. The parties ultimately parted ways without signing any agreement and clashes between Croat and Serb forces continued.

== Meeting and aftermath ==
On 6 May 1992, the representatives of the Serbian community of BiH, Radovan Karadžić, Momčilo Krajišnik and Branko Simić, and the Croatian Community of BiH, represented by Mate Boban and Franjo Boras, met without Bosnian Muslim representatives in the city of Graz in Austria to discuss the future of Bosnia and Herzegovina. Mate Boban and Radovan Karadžić issued a joint statement on 6 May 1992, describing it as a peace agreement and called for a general cease-fire in BiH. The territorial demarcation of the two communities in BiH was to be based on the 1939 borders of Banovina of Croatia. It was agreed that "in defining the borderline between the two constituent units in the area of Kupres, as well as Bosanska Posavina [...] account should be taken of the compactness of areas and communications." However, an agreement was not reached for the strip of land along the banks of the Neretva, near Mostar, nor the town of Mostar, which is why the parties wanted the European Community to arbitrate their respective claims regarding these regions. The agreement concluded: "in view of this agreement, no more reasons obtain for an armed conflict between the Croatians and the Serbs in the entire territory of Bosnia and Herzegovina."

The parties ultimately parted ways on 6 May 1992, without signing any agreement, and clashes between Croat and Serb forces continued. As of May 1992, military cooperation was achieved between the Croatian Defence Council (HVO) and the Army of the Republic of Bosnia and Herzegovina (ARBiH) against Serb forces.

== Reception ==
According to Vreme’s military analyst Miloš Vasić the Graz agreement was "the single most important document of the war" and was meant to limit conflict between Serb and Croat forces by allowing both parties to concentrate on taking Bosniak territory from the Bosnian forces. The agreement was seen as Bosnian Croats betraying their Bosniak allies. It was also seen as a sequel to the Milošević-Tuđman Karađorđevo meeting by the ICTY judgement in the Blaškić case. A Washington Post editorial compared the agreement to the Hitler-Stalin pact that divided Poland.

In the ICTY case against Prlić et al., Herbert S. Okun was called to testify in April 2007. In this capacity as the deputy of Cyrus Vance, UN special envoy to the Balkans, he had attended a number of meetings where the division of Bosnia Herzegovina was discussed. As Okun described it, the aspirations of Croatia and Serbia for the annexation of parts of Bosnia and Herzegovina became evident after Tuđman and Milošević met in Karađorđevo in March 1991 and after the meeting of Mate Boban and Radovan Karadžić in May 1992 in Graz. Neither party kept their plans for the creation of separate states within Bosnia-Herzegovina and their annexation to Serbia and Croatia secret at their subsequent meetings with international diplomats. Herbert Okun testified that on May 6, 1992, Radovan Karadžić and Mate Boban met in Graz in Austria to discuss the partition of Bosnia and Herzegovina along the boundaries of the Croatian Banovina. Herbert Okun also testified that during the international conference on the former Yugoslavia, held between September 1992 and May 1993, Franjo Tuđman was the de facto president of the Bosnian Croat delegation, including, among others, Mate Boban and Milivoj Petković. During that conference, Herbert Okun heard Franjo Tuđman make statements about extending the borders of Croatia, either directly or by including Herceg-Bosna within Croatia. He also heard him make statements about his support for the government of Mate Boban.

The May 2013 ICTY judgement in the case discusses the joint statement made in Graz, as well as the subsequent Agreement on Friendship and Cooperation between Bosnia and Herzegovina and Croatia and the peace plans offered before and during the Bosnian War.
