= Bosnian Movement of National Pride =

Bosnian Movement of National Pride Bosanski pokret nacionalnog ponosa
- Founded: 5 January 2009
- Dissolved: ~2021
- Headquarters: Sarajevo
- Ideology: Neo-Nazism; Bosnian nationalism Ultranationalism; Third Position; Hard Euroscepticism; Secularism; Anti-Serbian sentiment Anti-Croatian sentiment Antisemitism
- Political position: Far-right
- Colours
- Ethnic group: Bosniaks

Website
- www.bosanskinacionalisti.org

The Bosnian Movement of National Pride (Bosnian: Bosanski pokret nacionalnog ponosa, BPNP) was a far-right, neo-Nazi political organization in Bosnia and Herzegovina. The organization was founded on 5 January 2009 by nationalists in Sarajevo. As of June 2021, the organization is inactive and has not posted to its social media feeds in months, and has been considered defunct by many locals.

== Goals and the program ==
1. Bosniaks' Bosnia – only people belonging to European genetic and cultural heritage, Bosniaks included, can be the citizens of Bosnia.
2. Bosnia must be ruled by Bosniaks – Bosniaks must not be subordinated to other constitutive peoples in Bosnia, and that will be reached by preventing non-Bosniaks from being in ruling positions.
3. Bosnia must be ruled for the better well-being of Bosniaks – all political decisions must be based on what is the best for Bosniaks. All decisions that will bring harm to Bosniaks must not be realised.
4. Unique purpose – The state's organization must be led by a single modern policy which benefits Bosniaks as much as possible. This policy must be built on competence and responsibility, and its mission is to serve the population, not conversely. The system must maintain the motto: improvement, development, and welfare of the entire nation.
5. Total independence of the country – Cooperations in some fields are desirable with other countries, but any contract that would damage the independence of Bosnia even slightly is out of the question.
6. Safe, secular state – Safety, both individual and economic, must be one of the social bases. The state must be secular, so religion must be separated from the state, subordinated to the laws, have its influence on public life be reduced, and be prevented from influencing the state's authority.
7. Freedom of speech and opinions – All questions must be free for discussion, science must be free, and restriction of personal integrity through state control (excluding the case of criminals) must not exist.
8. Natural resources in the hands of Bosniaks – Important natural resources must be under the control of Bosniaks, so that all profit can go back to the population, and not abroad nor to private interests.
9. National board and social justice – The division of classes must be replaced with class community where creativity and productive contribution are respected and no group of society can advance at the expense of the other one.
10. Strict protection of animals and nature – Bosnia has valuable and unique biodiversity which must be kept safe and defended. Every form of destruction in regards to the environment, as well as the killing of animals, must be strictly prohibited. Food industries and others where animals are kept and used must be ethically sustainable.

== Symbols ==
The logo of the movement resembles the coat of arms of the Republic of Bosnia and Herzegovina with some additions like the sword in the middle of the logo. They refer themselves also sometimes as the "National Front" which is basically a common used name for the movement.

== Funding and organization ==
Balkan Insight reports that the members of organization say it is funded by the Bosniak diaspora. It uses a website, bosanskinacionalisti.org, as well as social media to recruit members. Its social media feed has many positive remarks about Hitler.
