= Greater Bosnia =

Bosniak nationalist concept

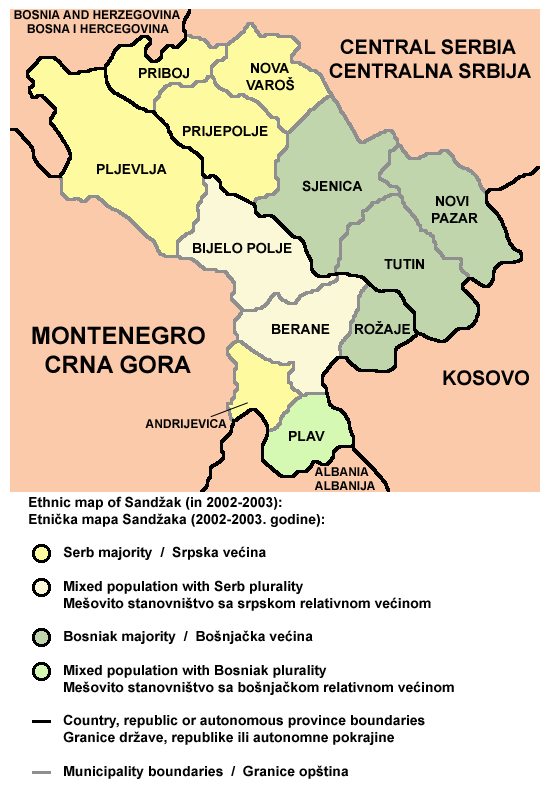
Ethnic map of Sandžak, divided between Montenegro and Serbia. Bosniaks from a majority in southern areas of the region.

Greater Bosnia (Bosnian: Velika Bosna) is an irredentist concept seeking the enlargement of Bosnia and Herzegovina. It is more popular among ethnic Bosniaks, as Bosnian Croats more commonly support the creation of a separate Croat entity in Bosnia and Herzegovina or integration into Croatia while Bosnian Serbs prefer to side with a possible secession of Republika Srpska or its merger with Serbia. Bosniak irredentism often endorses the annexation of the region of Sandžak, where a Bosniak community lives.

Džafer Kulenović, leader of the Yugoslav Muslim Organization, supported the creation of a Greater Bosnia including Sandžak sponsored by the Independent State of Croatia during World War II.

Franjo Tuđman, the first president of Croatia, accused Alija Izetbegović, the first chairman of the Presidency of Bosnia and Herzegovina, of conspiring to create a Greater Bosnia along with Turkey and to create an Islamic fundamentalist state with the help of 500,000 ethnic Turks that were to come to Bosnia and which would expand its influence to Sandžak and Kosovo. Tuđman was opposed to maintaining Bosnia's borders at the time and advocated for a partition of the country along ethnic lines.

== See also ==
- Bosniak nationalism
- Greater Croatia
- Greater Serbia
