= Karađorđevo estate =

Historic estate in Bačka Palanka, Serbia

Coordinates: 45.278956°N 19.320379°E

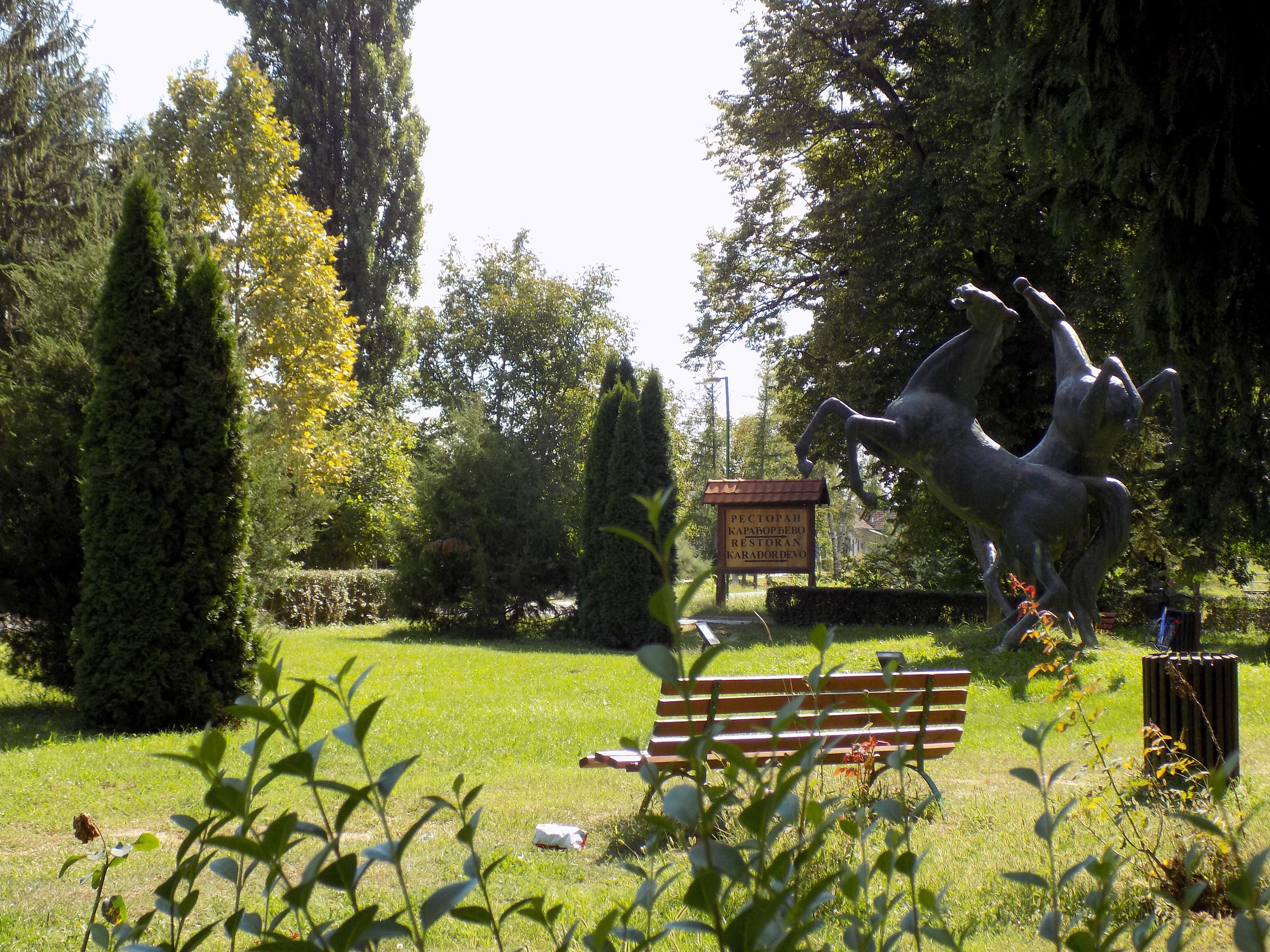
Entrance to the stable complex

The Karađorđevo (Serbian Cyrillic: Карађорђево) estate lies 10 km north-west of Bačka Palanka, Serbia. The estate covers an area of 69.14 square kilometres (26.70 sq mi) and features a manor house, hunting ground, stud farm, agricultural facilities, and forest and wetland habitats. The property is state-owned, and managed by the Ministry of Defence of Serbia. Since its establishment as a state property of the Austro-Hungarian Empire in 1885, it has served as a representative hunting ground and resort for statesmen, high-ranking military officials and businessmen. A part of the property is protected as a special nature reserve, occupying the area of 29.55 square kilometres (11.41 sq mi).

The landscape features centuries-old oak and acacia woods, marshes, variety of flora and fauna species and a long distance from the nearest settlements. It is open to hunters and tourists throughout the year.

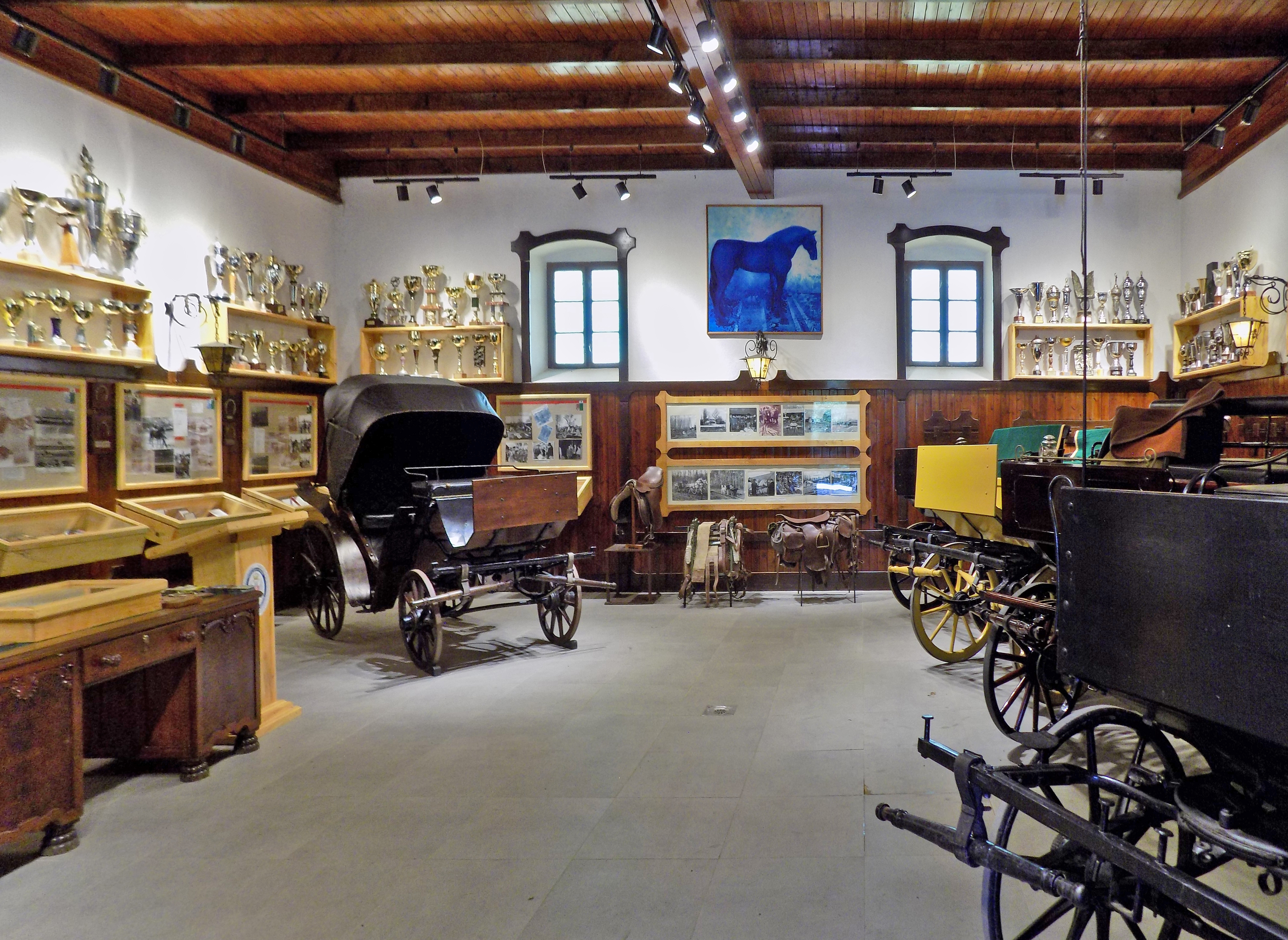
Museum of the estate

The property is also famous for its elite stud farm, with a museum of horse racing. The farm was originally created in 1904, using horses from the famous Hungarian State Stud of Mezőhegyes.

In 1971, Josip Broz Tito convened a joint meeting of the leaders of the League of Communists of Yugoslavia and the League of Communists of Croatia at the Karađorđevo estate which resulted in a suppression of the Croatian Spring.

The resort gained notoriety when the Milošević–Tuđman Karađorđevo meeting was held there by presidents of Serbia Slobodan Milošević and Croatia Franjo Tuđman on the eve of the Yugoslav Wars, where they purportedly made a secret deal about partition of Bosnia and Herzegovina.
