= Partition of Bosnia and Herzegovina =

Planned division of the region of Bosnia and Herzegovina by Serbia and Croatia

The partition of Bosnia and Herzegovina was discussed and attempted during the 20th century. The issue came to prominence during the Bosnian War, which also involved Bosnia and Herzegovina's largest neighbors, Croatia and Serbia. As of 2026, the country remains one state while internal political divisions of Bosnia and Herzegovina based on the 1995 Dayton Agreement remain in place.

== Background ==
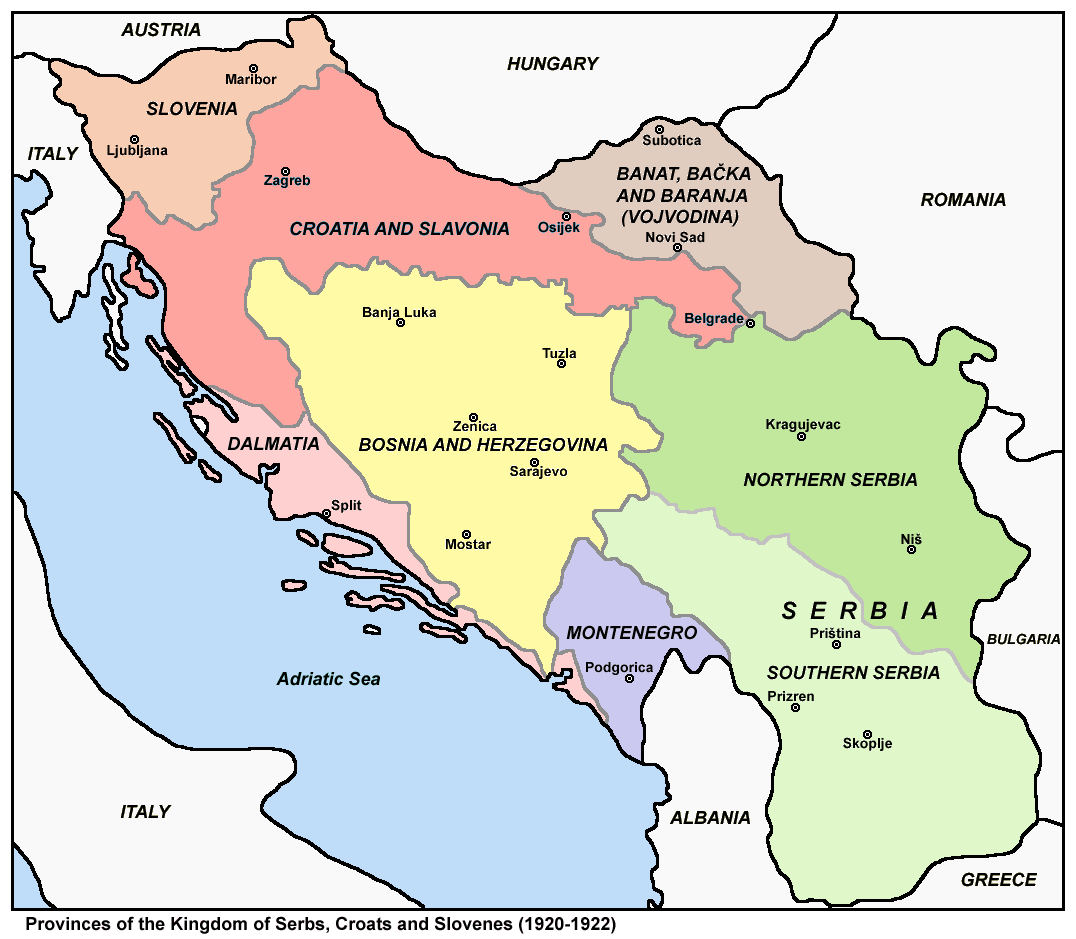
Provinces of the Kingdom of Serbs, Croats and Slovenes in 1920–1922.

Bosnia and Herzegovina has been a single entity occupying roughly the same territory since the rise of the medieval Kingdom of Bosnia and the subsequent Ottoman conquest of Bosnia between the 1380s and 1590s. The borders of today's Bosnia and Herzegovina were largely set as the borders of the Ottoman-era Eyalet of Bosnia, fixed in the south and west by the 1699 Treaty of Karlowitz, in the north by the 1739 Treaty of Belgrade, and in the east by the 1878 Treaty of Berlin.

Although formally under Ottoman sovereignty, Austria-Hungary occupied the territory and created the Condominium of Bosnia and Herzegovina in 1878 before officially annexing it in 1908. Following World War I and the dissolution of Austria-Hungary, the territory passed in whole to the newly formed Kingdom of the Serbs, Croats and Slovenes in 1918. In 1922, it was internally divided into six oblasts of the Kingdom of Serbs, Croats and Slovenes.

== Kingdom of Yugoslavia ==
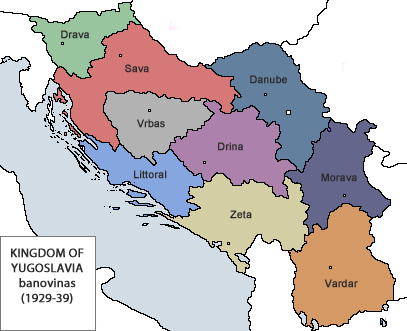
Yugoslav banovinas in 1929

In 1929, the oblasts were replaced with four Banovinas of the Kingdom of Yugoslavia, but all of them also included regions outside of Bosnia and Herzegovina.

The Cvetković–Maček Agreement that created the Banovina of Croatia in 1939 encouraged what was essentially a partition of Bosnia between Croatia and Serbia. The agreement angered Bosniaks, then known as Yugoslav Muslims, including the Yugoslav Muslim Organization (JMO) that denounced the agreement's partition of Bosnia and Herzegovina.

== Yugoslav Wars ==
During the Bosnian War, it was proposed that Bosnia be divided into three ethnic states, a Bosnian Muslim Republic, a Serb Republic, and a Croat Republic.

The Serb and Croat political leadership agreed on a partition of Bosnia with the 1991 Milošević–Tuđman Karađorđevo meeting and the 1992 Graz agreement, resulting in the Croat forces turning against the Army of the Republic of Bosnia and Herzegovina and the Croat–Bosniak War (1992–94).

In 1992, negotiations continued between Serb and Croat leaderships over the partitioning of Bosnia and Herzegovina.

Franjo Tuđman argued that Bosnia-Herzegovina should form part of the federal Croatian unit because it was linked historically to Croatia. Tuđman did not take a separate Bosnia seriously as shown by his comments to a television crew, saying "Bosnia was a creation of the Ottoman invasion [...] Until then it was part of Croatia, or it was a kingdom of Bosnia, but a Catholic kingdom, linked to Croatia." In 1981 Tuđman stated that a federal Bosnia-Herzegovina "was more often a source of new divisions between the Serb and Croat population than their bridge". Moreover, Tuđman observed that from an ethnic and linguistic viewpoint most Bosniaks were of Croatian origin. He argued that a Bosniak identity could only benefit the Serbs and hence advance the timing of Bosnia's "reasonable territorial division".

According to Warren Zimmermann, the last US ambassador to Yugoslavia, Tuđman claimed that Bosnia and Herzegovina should be divided between the Croats and the Serbs. "Tuđman admitted that he discussed these fantasies with Milošević, the Yugoslav Army leadership and the Bosnian Serbs," wrote Zimmermann, "and they agreed that the only solution is to divide up Bosnia between Serbia and Croatia". Zimmermann also testified about Tuđman's fears of an "Islamic fundamentalist state", referring to Izetbegović as a "fundamentalist front man for Turkey" and accused them of "conspiring to create a Greater Bosnia" by "flooding Bosnia with 500,000 Turks."

Mario Nobilo, a senior advisor to Tuđman, is reported by Tim Judah to have informed him directly that talks took place "to resolve the Yugoslav conflict by carving up the Republic of Bosnia and Herzegovina and creating an Islamic buffer-state between them".

Testimonies of other American and British politicians such as Ambassador Herbert Okun (a US veteran diplomat) suggested that the meeting was about the division of Bosnia and Herzegovina. Paddy Ashdown also claimed that the division of Bosnia and Herzegovina between Croatia and Serbia was a goal of Tuđman's. Ashdown's testimony at the ICTY that Tuđman told him that he agreed on a partition of Bosnia with Milošević, drawing a map of Bosnia showing the proposed demarcation line at a meeting in London on 6 May 1995, was accepted into the trial judgement for Kordić & Čerkez.

Stjepan Mesić held Milošević responsible for "creating a Greater Serbia on the ruins of the Former Yugoslavia". Mesić revealed thousands of documents and audio tapes recorded by Tuđman about his plans during a case against Croat leaders from Bosnia and Herzegovina for war crimes committed against Bosniaks. The tapes reveal that Tuđman and Milošević ignored pledges to respect Bosnia's sovereignty, even after signing the Dayton accord. In one conversation Tuđman told an official: "Let's make a deal with the Serbs. Neither history nor emotion in the Balkans will permit multinationalism. We have to give up on the illusion of the last eight years... Dayton isn't working. Nobody - except diplomats and petty officials - believes in a sovereign Bosnia and the Dayton accords." In another he is heard telling a Bosnian Croat ally, "You should give no indication that we wish the three-way division of Bosnia." The tapes also reveal Tuđman's involvement in atrocities against the Bosniaks in Bosnia, including the Croatian president covering up war crimes at Ahmići where more than a hundred Bosniak men, women and children were terrorised, and then shot or burned to death. When asked if "Tuđman's view was that Bosnia was a mistake and that it was a mistake to make it as a republic after the Second World War and that it should be annexed to Croatia", Mesić responded "Those were his ideas, that Bosnia was supposed to belong to Croatia on the basis of a decision that should have been adopted by AVNOJ."

The Yugoslav Wars resulted in at least 97,000 deaths of citizens of Bosnia and Herzegovina, and more than 1.5 million expelled. A country where previously no region could be described as purely Bosniak, Serb or Croat shifted to a partitioning into multiple ethnically homogeneous nations.

The policies of Tuđman and Croatia towards Bosnia and Herzegovina were never completely transparent, but always included his ultimate aim of expanding Croatia's borders. In the Tihomir Blaškić verdict, the Trial Chamber found that "Croatia, and more specifically former President Tuđman, was hoping to partition Bosnia and exercised such a degree of control over the Bosnian Croats and especially the HVO that it is justified to speak of overall control."

=== Bosnian Serb involvement ===
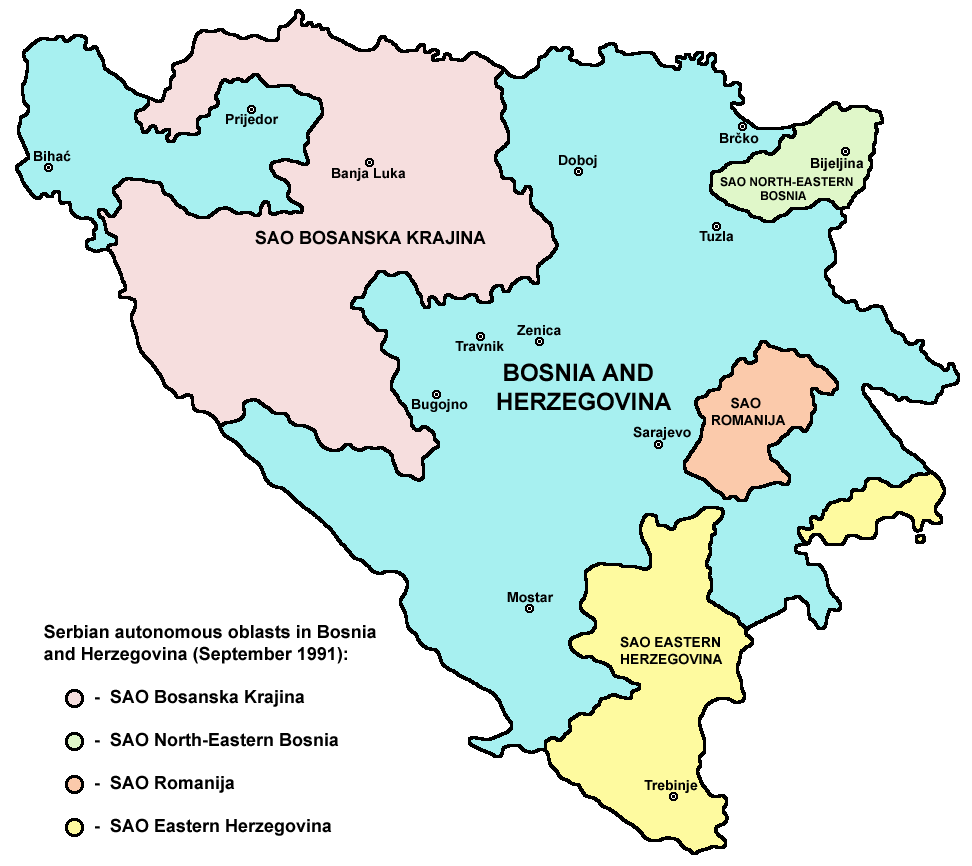
Serbian Autonomous Provinces from 1991–92, created in rebellion against the government of Bosnia and Herzegovina

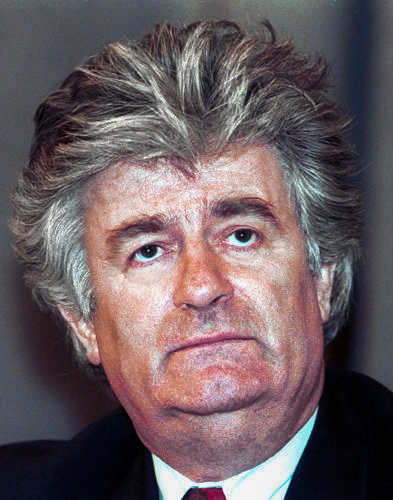
Radovan Karadžić, the first president of Republika Srpska.

Most of the Bosnian Serb wartime leadership Radovan Karadžić, Biljana Plavšić, Momčilo Krajišnik, Radoslav Brđanin, Duško Tadić were indicted and judged guilty for war crimes and ethnic cleansing. The top military general Ratko Mladić is under trial by the ICTY in connection with the siege of Sarajevo and the Srebrenica massacre. Serbian president Slobodan Milošević was also accused of genocide in Bosnia and Herzegovina and war crimes in Croatia, however he died before judgment concurred.

The Amended Consolidated Indictment, [...] alleges that, between 1 July 1991 and 30 December 1992, in order to secure control of various municipalities of Bosnia and Herzegovina which had been proclaimed part of the Serbian Republic of Bosnia and Herzegovina, the Bosnian Serb leadership, including Momčilo Krajišnik, Biljana Plavšić and Radovan Karadžić, pursued a course of conduct involving the creation of impossible conditions of life, persecution and terror tactics in order to encourage non-Serbs to leave the area, deportation of those reluctant to leave, and the liquidation of others. From late March 1992, Bosnian Serb forces seized physical control of many of the municipalities of Bosnia and Herzegovina which had been proclaimed part of the "Serbian Republic of Bosnia and Herzegovina".

The ICTY judged as follows:

The Chamber finds that a joint criminal enterprise existed throughout the territories of the Bosnian-Serb Republic. There was a centrally-based core component of the group, which included Mr Krajišnik, Radovan Karadžić, and other Bosnian-Serb leaders. The rank and file of the joint criminal enterprise was based in the regions and municipalities of the Bosnian-Serb Republic, and maintained close links with the leadership in the Bosnian-Serb capital of Pale. [...] The common objective of the joint criminal enterprise was to ethnically recompose the territories targeted by the Bosnian-Serb leadership by drastically reducing the proportion of Bosnian Muslims and Bosnian Croats through expulsion. The Chamber finds that the crimes of deportation and forced transfer were the original crimes of this common objective. Mr Krajišnik gave the go-ahead for the expulsion programme to commence during a session of the Bosnian-Serb Assembly when he called for [and I quote], "implementing what we have agreed upon, the ethnic division on the ground".

The Trial Chamber found that the strategic plan of the Bosnian Serb leadership consisted of "a plan to link Serb-populated areas in BiH together, to gain control over these areas and to create a separate Bosnian Serb state, from which most non-Serbs would be permanently removed". It also found that media in certain areas focused only on SDS policy and reports from Belgrade became more prominent, including the presentation of extremist views and promotion of the concept of a Greater Serbia, just as in other parts of Bosnia and Herzegovina the concept of a Greater Croatia was openly advocated.

=== Bosnian Croat involvement ===
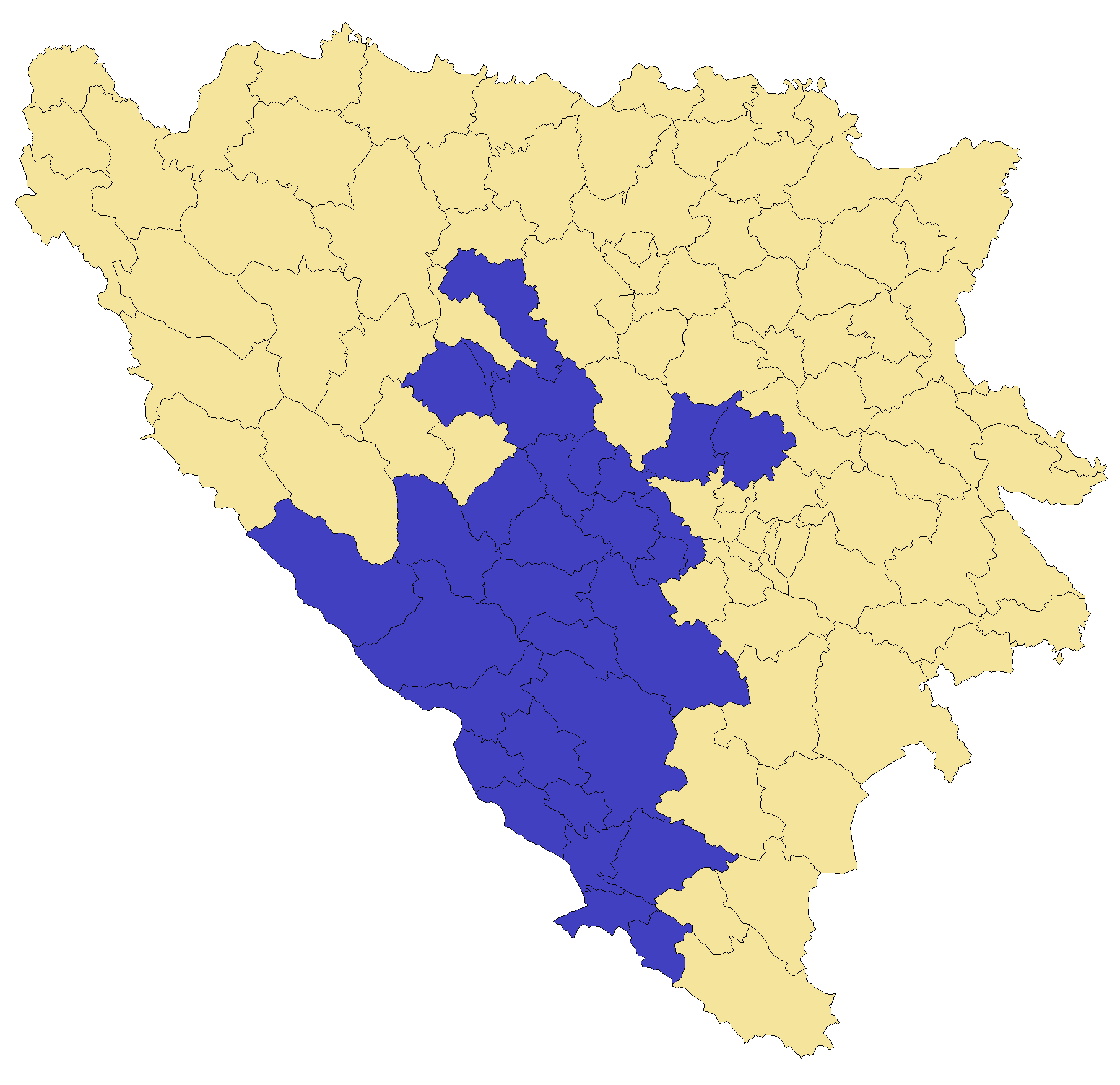
30 municipalities declared part of the Croatian Republic of Herzeg-Bosnia in 1991

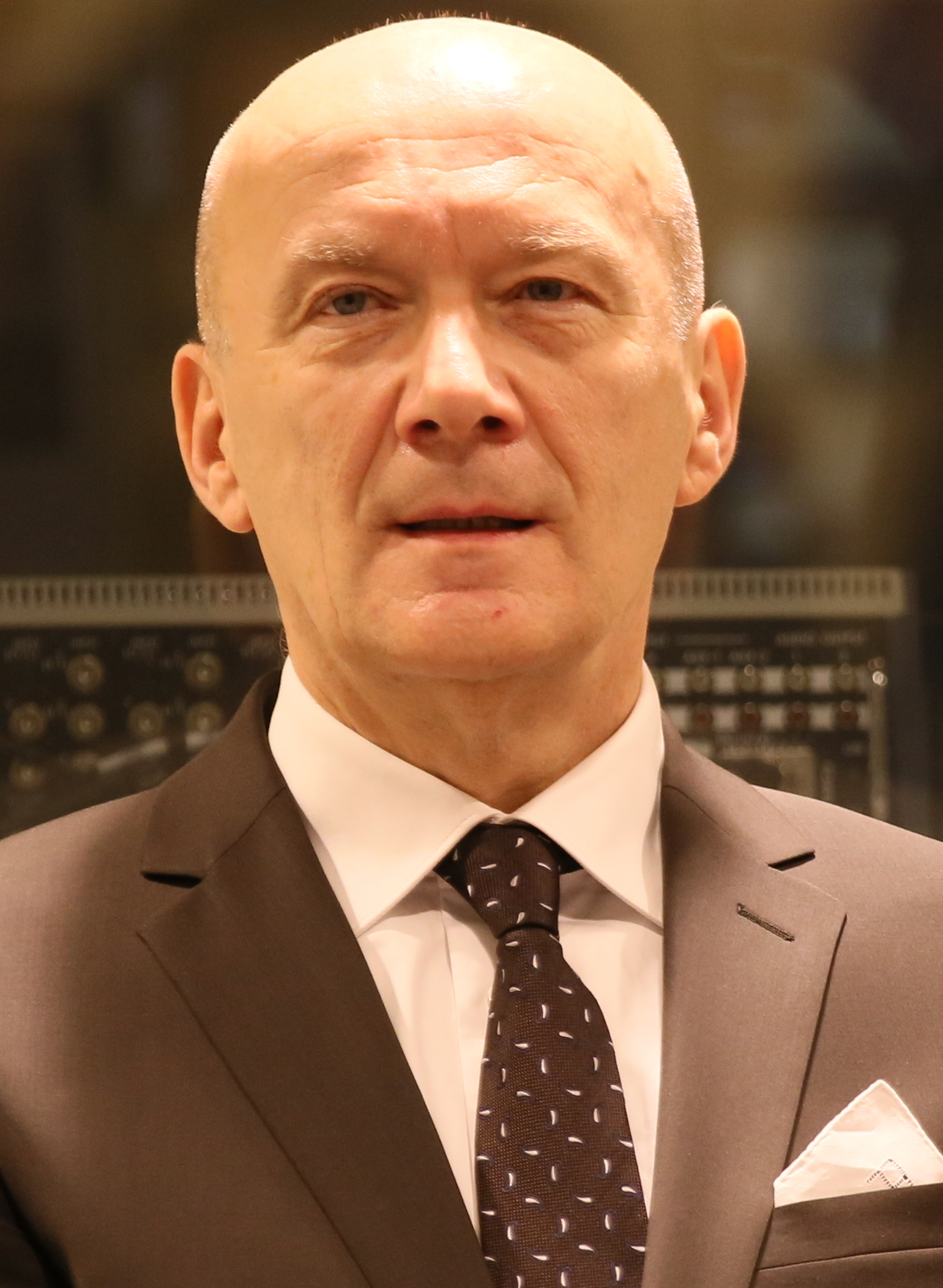
Jadranko Prlić, the first Prime Minister of Herzeg-Bosnia

On 13 October 1997, Croatian weekly Feral Tribune published a document drafted by the Bosnian HDZ in 1991 and signed by its leading members Mate Boban, Vladimir Šoljić, Božo Raić, Ivan Bender, Pero Marković, Dario Kordić and others. It stated, among other things, that "[...] the Croat people in Bosnia-Herzegovina must finally undertake a decisive and active policy that should bring about the realisation of our centuries-old dream: a common Croatian state."

Based on the evidence of Croat attacks against Bosniaks, the ICTY Trial Chamber concluded in the Kordić and Čerkez case that by April 1993 Croat leadership had a common design or plan conceived and executed to ethnically cleanse Bosniaks from the Lašva Valley. Kordić, as the local political leader, was found to be the planner and instigator of this plan. Further concluding that the Croatian Army was involved in the campaign, the ICTY defined the events as an international conflict between Bosnia and Herzegovina and Croatia. Kordić along with commander Mario Čerkez were sentenced to 25 and 15 years respectively.

In the Tihomir Blaškić verdict, of March 2000, the Trial Chamber concluded "[...] that Croatia, and more specifically former President Tudjman, was hoping to partition Bosnia and exercised such a degree of control over the Bosnian Croats and especially the HVO that it is justified to speak of overall control."

Jadranko Prlić, Bruno Stojić, Slobodan Praljak, Milivoj Petković, Valentin Ćorić, and Berislav Pušić were all charged with conducting a joint criminal enterprise with a purpose of politically and military subjugating, permanently removing and ethnically cleansing Bosniaks and other non-Croats from certain areas of Bosnia and Herzegovina in an effort to join these areas as part of a Greater Croatia. The amended indictment (Prlic et al. case) by the ICTY (International Criminal Tribunal for the former Yugoslavia) states that at a meeting with his closest advisers and a group of Croat nationalists from BiH, Tuđman declared that "It is time that we take the opportunity to gather the Croatian people inside the widest possible borders." pointing out the opportunity to expand Croatia's border at the expense of BiH territory. The indictment regards not just Tuđman, but also other key figures from the Republic of Croatia including former Minister of Defence Gojko Šušak and senior General Janko Bobetko as participants. The amended indictment goes further to say:

[...] to about April 1994 and thereafter, various persons established and participated in a joint criminal enterprise to politically and militarily subjugate, permanently remove and ethnically cleanse Bosnian Muslims and other non-Croats who lived in areas on the territory of the Republic of Bosnia and Herzegovina which were claimed to be part of the Croatian Community and later Republic of Herceg-Bosna; and to join these areas as part of a 'Greater Croatia' whether in the short term or over time and whether as part of the Republic of Croatia or in close association with it. [...] The territorial ambition of the joint criminal enterprise was to establish a Croatian territory with the borders of the Croatian Banovina, a territorial entity that existed from 1939 to 1941.

The Prosecution submitted that part of the Greater Croatia-Herceg-Bosna program had at least three important goals.

First, it was clear to probably anyone who looked at it with any sort of intellectual objectivity that some municipalities and areas claimed by Herceg-Bosna were more Croat than others and with some of the areas on the fringes more toward the east, more towards Central Bosnia not having a strong Croat majority or even plurality. [...] As a second reason, as a matter of political, military, and economic practicalities and part of the ultimate what I will call horse trading with the Serbs and the Muslims, Tudjman and the Herceg-Bosna leaders recognised that they might have to give up or trade away some of the areas furthest from the core Banovina territory. [...] Third and equally important and as already mentioned, relocating Croats from other parts of Bosnia-Herzegovina and moving them into houses and flats which had been seized from or abandoned by Muslim families or Muslim families which have been expelled would make it more difficult, if not impossible, for the Muslims to return to those areas, their houses having been taken over by Croats.

== Proposed secession of Republika Srpska ==
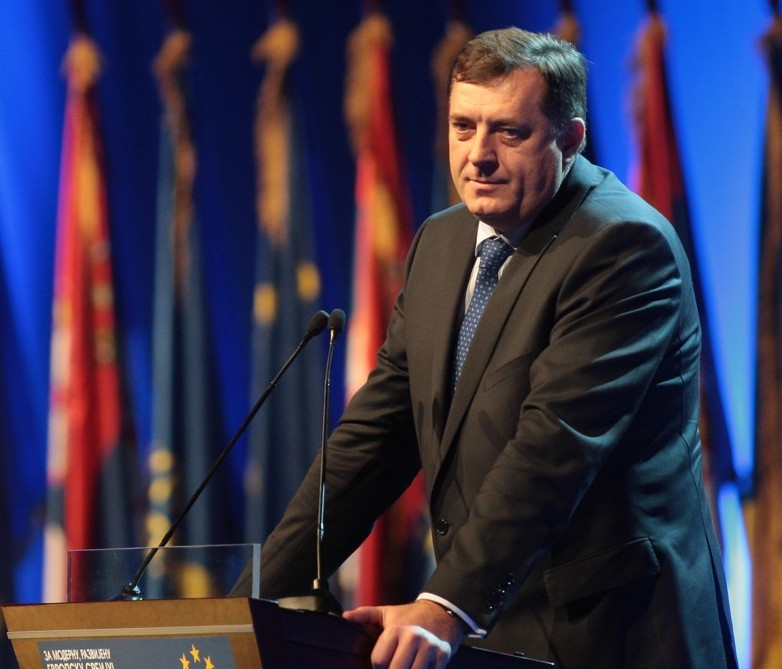
Milorad Dodik, the president of the Republika Srpska

Secessionist rhetoric in Bosnia and Herzegovina made a comeback after 2006, with the coming to power of the SNSD party in Republika Srpska, headed by Milorad Dodik, notwithstanding international experts such as James Ker-Lindsay had defined it as a "hollow threat" and an unfeasible plan.

On 25 April 2015 the ruling SNSD party adopted a declaration entitled "Republika Srpska — free and independent — future and responsibility", stating its intention to organize a referendum on the independence of the Republika Srpska in case competences are not returned from the State to the Entities by 2017. The declaration also suggests that RS authorities might decide "by law which decisions made by the Bosnia and Herzegovina authorities shall be applicable on the territory of Republika Srpska".

RS president Milorad Dodik reiterated to the press the commitment to an independence referendum in the coming years if his demands are not met. His stated political goal is to scale back the institutions of Bosnia and Herzegovina to the letter of the 1995 Dayton Peace Agreement, undoing the developments of the last twenty years including the Court of BiH and BiH Prosecutor's Office, as well as tweak such letter by getting rid of international judges sitting in the BiH Constitutional Court.

== 2021 Balkan non-papers ==
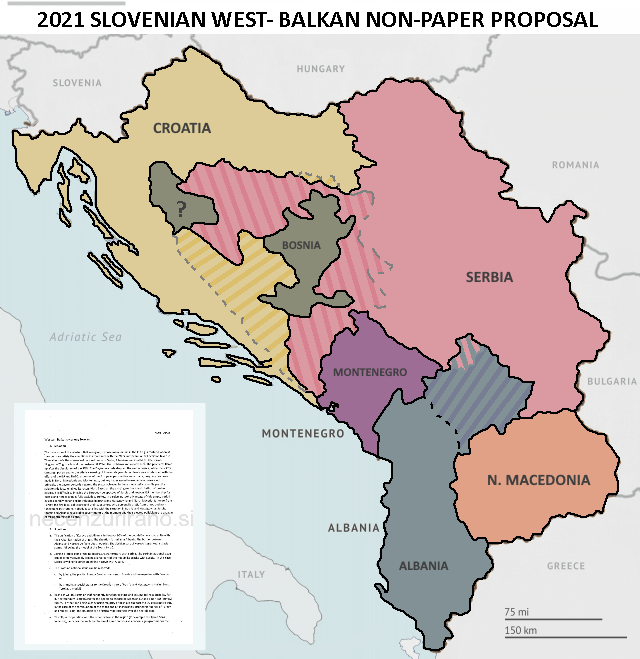
Map of the Western Balkans according to the first non-paper

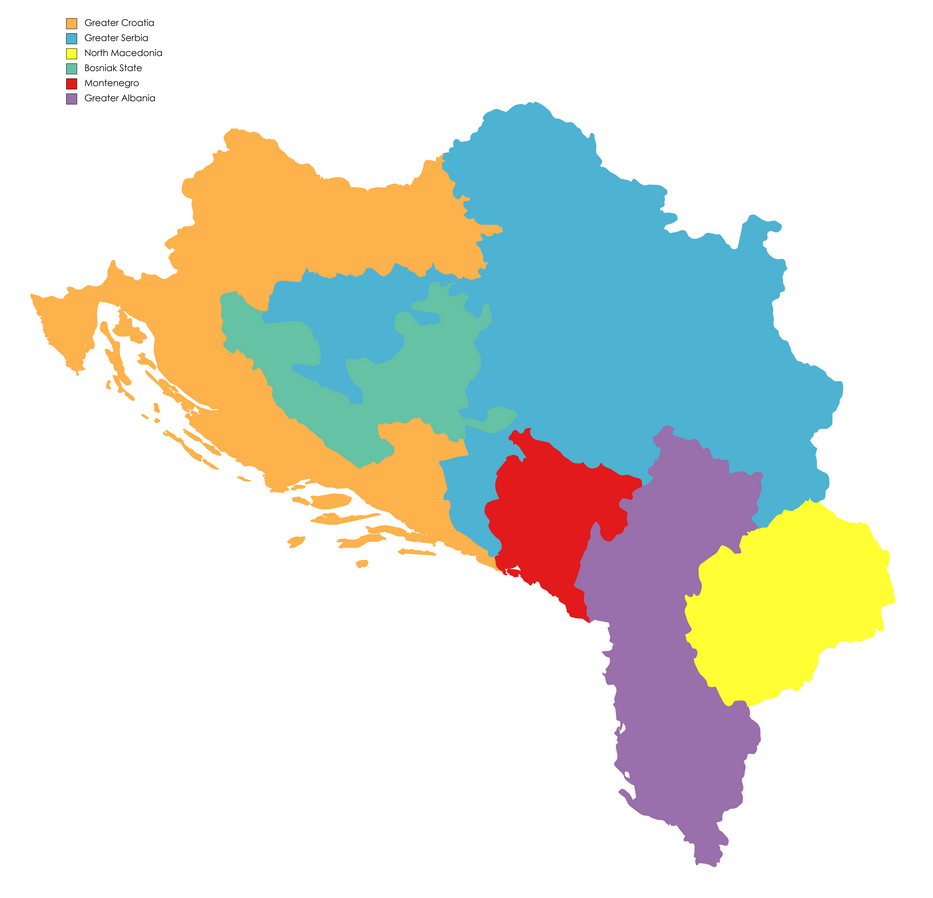
Other proposed redrawn borders map of the Western Balkans: Greater Croatia; Greater Serbia; Bosniak state; Montenegro; North Macedonia; Greater Albania

Two documents of unknown origin appeared on various internet forums, with several sources claiming that they had been drafted by the government of Slovenia, which carried proposals for the redrawing of borders in Southeastern Europe. The first non-paper called for the "peaceful dissolution" of Bosnia and Herzegovina with the annexation of Republika Srpska and great parts of Herzegovina and Central Bosnia into a Greater Serbia and Greater Croatia, leaving a small Bosniak state in what is central and western Bosnia, as well as the unification of Albania and Kosovo. The story about the first non-paper was first published by Bosnian web portal politicki.ba on 12 April 2021. The existence of the first non-paper was initially disputed, with Albanian prime minister Edi Rama being one of the few to claim to have been shown it. The Slovenian website Necenzurirano published the alleged non-paper on 15 April 2021.

The first non-paper's plans and ideas were heavily criticized and reacted to by many political leaders from the former Yugoslavia: Bosnia and Herzegovina, Serbia, Croatia, Montenegro, Slovenia, North Macedonia, as well as by politicians from the European Union and Russia. A second non-paper, which first appeared in Kosovo's Albanian-language media in April 2021, proposed that Serbia recognize Kosovo's independence by February 2022 and that Serb-majority North Kosovo be granted autonomy in return for Serbia's recognition.

== See also ==
- Peace plans proposed before and during the Bosnian War
- Washington Agreement
- Secession of Republika Srpska
- 2021 Balkan non-papers

== Sources ==
- Motyl, Alexander J. (2001). Encyclopedia of Nationalism, Volume II. Academic Press. ISBN 0-12-227230-7.
