= Operation Prijedor '95 =

1995 operation of the Bosnian War

- Part of the Bosnian War
- Objectives of Operation Prijedor on the map of Bosnia and Herzegovina
Date	12–20 October 1995
Location	Around Prijedor and Sanski Most
Result	Army of Republika Srpska victory: Army of Republika Srpska successfully defended Prijedor municipality; ARBiH failed to capture the remaining parts of Sanski Most; Sanki Most threatened
Territorial changes	Establishment of Oštra Luka in the Dayton Agreement

Belligerents
Republika Srpska	Republic of Bosnia and Herzegovina

Commanders and leaders
Željko Ražnatović; Radmilo Zeljaja	Atif Dudaković; Mehmed Alagić

Units involved
Army of Republika Srpska; 1st Krajina Corps; 1st Armored Brigade; 65th Protection Motorized Regiment; 43rd Prijedor Motorized Brigade; 1st Military Police Battalion; 5th Kozara Light Infantry Brigade; Serb Volunteer Guard	Army of the Republic of Bosnia and Herzegovina; 5th Corps; 7th Corps

Strength
12,000–16,000	15,000

Casualties and losses
Unknown	Heavy
- 1 civilian killed, 18 injured

Operation Prijedor '95 was the code name of the VRS operation to defend Prijedor. This was also one of the last battles of the Bosnian War. Goal of the ARBiH was to recapture the remaining parts of the Sanski Most municipality and advance north in to Prijedor capturing as much land as possible. ARBiH forces tried to capture Oštra Luka and then Prijedor, but in the process threatened the position of Sanski Most.

== Timeline of Operation ==
On 12 October 1995, the ceasefire entered into force in Bosnia and Herzegovina. However, the commander of the 5th Corps of the ARBiH, General Atif Dudaković, ignored the truce and ordered his troops to continue the offensive and to liberate Prijedor and Banja Luka under the attack of the 43rd Prijedor Motorized Brigade of the VRS, in the northeastern parts of Sanski Most. Which forced the forces of the 5th Corps to suspend offensive actions and go on the defensive, where they defend Sanski Most from the counteroffensive of the VRS units for the next week. ARBiH forces suffered heavy losses on the line Koprivna — Ališići — Usorci, and there was a possibility that Sanski Most would fall under the control of Republika Srpska. From 13 to 17 October, 64 shells were fired from the direction of Sanski Most towards the narrower part of the city of Prijedor, but without significant success. In that ARBiH bombing, one person was killed and 18 were wounded. The fighting was suspended on 20 October.

== Aftermath ==
When the Dayton Agreement map was completed in December 1995, the accords were signed by Slobodan Milošević, Franjo Tuđman and Alija Izetbegović. The agreement left about half (49%) of the territory of Bosnia-Herzegovina in the hands of the Bosnian Serbs. The Prijedor municipality remains in the Serb-controlled part of Bosnia. The part of the municipality of Sanski Most that remained in Serbian hands until the end of the war became its own municipality under the name of Oštra Luka.

== Sources ==
- Central Intelligence Agency, Office of Russian and European Analysis (2002). Balkan Battlegrounds: A Military History of the Yugoslav Conflict, 1990–1995, Volume 1. Washington, D.C.: Central Intelligence Agency. ISBN 978-0-16-066472-4.
- Meier, Viktor (1999). Yugoslavia: a history of its demise. Routledge. ISBN 9780415185967.
