= 7th Corps (Army of the Republic of Bosnia and Herzegovina) =

- 7. korpus
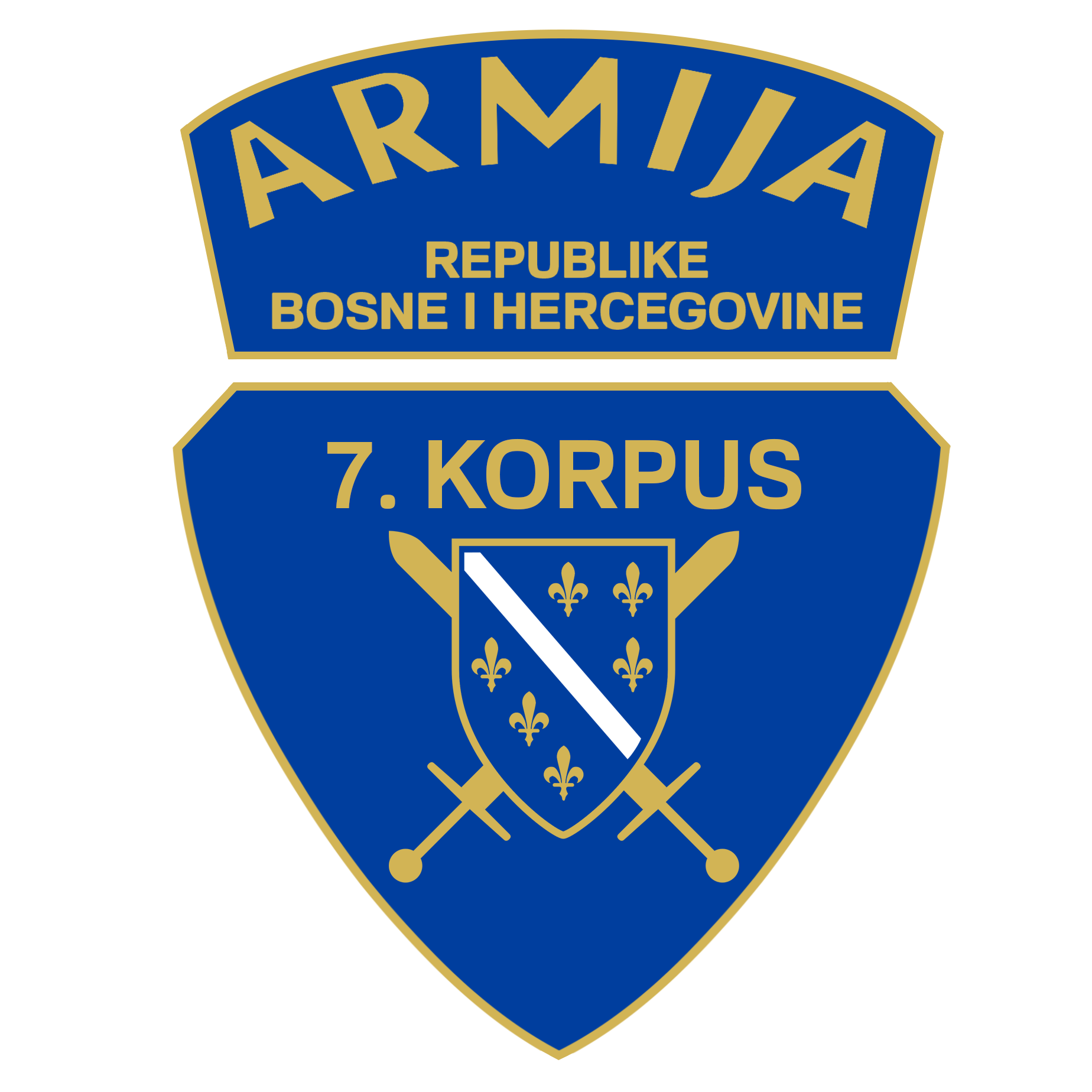
- Emblem of the 7th Corps
- Active: 7 April 1994 – 1995
- Country: Republic of Bosnia and Herzegovina
- Branch: Army
- Type: Army Corps
- Role: Land warfare
- Size: 23,997 personnel
- Part of: Army of the Republic of Bosnia and Herzegovina
- Garrison/HQ: Travnik
- Nickname: Angry (Bosnian: Ljuti)
- Anniversaries: April 7th
- Engagements: Bosnian War; Battle of Kupres (1994); Operation Vlašić; Operation Tekbir '95; Operation Sana; Operation Prijedor '95

Commanders
- Corps Commander: Mehmed Alagić
- Deputy Commander: Fikret Ćuskić
- Chief of Staff: Kadir Jusić
- Assistant Commander for Security: Ramiz Dugalić
- Assistant Commander for Logistics: Abdulah Jeleč
- Assistant Commander for Finance: Mustafa Šanta
- Chief of Training Department: Remzija Šiljak

Insignia
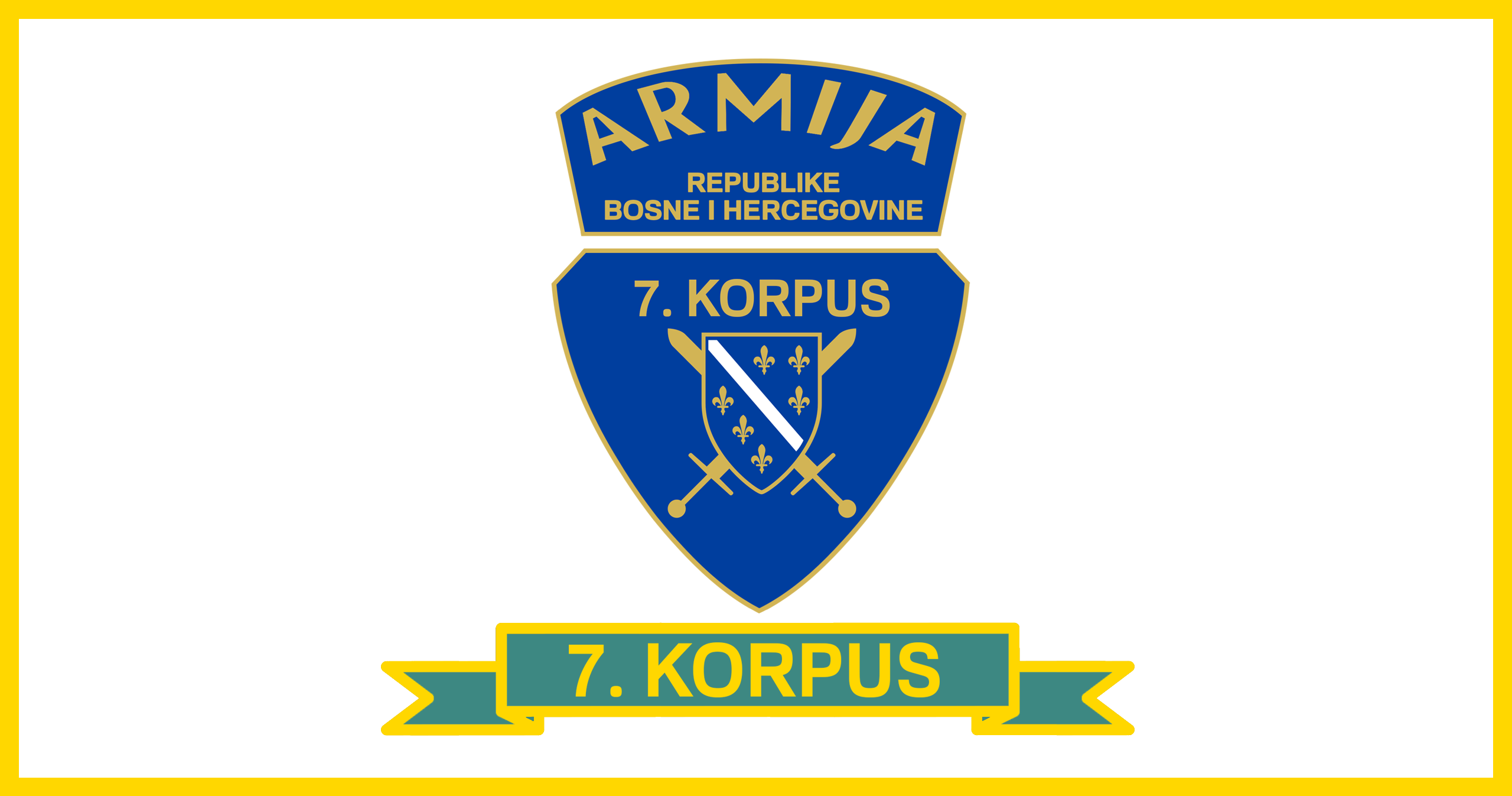
- Flag

The 7th Corps (Bosnian: Sedmi korpus) was a military unit of the Army of the Republic of Bosnia and Herzegovina, active during the tumultuous breakup of Yugoslavia and the ensuing Bosnian War. It was one of six army corps, following the disbandment of the 6th Corps on February 26, 1994, and the decision not to form an 8th Corps.

Established during the later stages of the Bosnian War, the 7th Corps was primarily tasked with unifying military forces from the Bosnian Krajina (Bosnian: Bosanska Krajina) in Central Bosnia (Bosnian: Srednja Bosna). Its headquarters and main military base were located in Travnik. The official establishment of the 7th Corps followed a period of intense preparation and negotiation, complicated by ongoing hostilities, particularly between the Army of the Republic of Bosnia and Herzegovina and the Croatian Defence Council (HVO). Only after the cessation of these internal clashes—formalized through the Washington Agreement in March 1994—could the Corps be effectively organized and deployed. Appointed as its first commander was Brigadier General Mehmed Alagić, a military leader who brought both strategic insight and organizational discipline to the new formation.

From its inception, the Corps played a central role in key military operations aimed at regaining control over occupied territories and securing vital logistical corridors. It also served as a symbol of the Republic's ability to adapt and reconfigure its forces in response to the evolving demands of the war. Beyond its tactical significance, the Corps reflected the maturing institutional capacity of the Army of the Republic of Bosnia and Herzegovina, representing a shift toward more structured, professional military organization even amidst the turmoil of conflict.

In the post-war period, following the Dayton Peace Agreement, the 7th Corps, like all wartime formations, entered a phase of demobilization and transformation. As Bosnia and Herzegovina moved toward peace and reconstruction, the military underwent a gradual process of unification and professionalization. The legacy of the 7th Corps thus extends beyond its battlefield contributions; it stands as a symbol of resilience, adaptability, and the continued struggle to assert and defend Bosnian sovereignty during one of the most turbulent periods in the country's modern history.

== Background ==
The organization and development of Bosnia and Herzegovina's armed forces evolved through several stages. In the early days of the conflict, defense efforts were modeled on Yugoslavia's concept of "all-national defense." With much of the territory under occupation and the nation engaged in armed struggle against two adversaries – Army of Republika Srpska supported by Serbia and later the Croatian Defence Council supported by Croatia, this territorial defense strategy emerged as the only viable approach under the circumstances.

=== Territorial Defense of the Socialist Republic of Bosnia and Herzegovina ===
The concept was rooted in the idea of mass civilian resistance, inspired by the partisan movement of the Second World War. However, from the very beginning, its development and organizational structure also reflected an effort to achieve a strategic balance of political power between the Yugoslav federation and its constituent republics and provinces. The Territorial Defense of the Socialist Republic of Bosnia and Herzegovina maintained a very small peacetime core, consisting of just 1,403 personnel across the entire country. By early April 1992, only 91 active officers were serving, while the remainder of the force comprised reserve military officers and civilians.

=== Territorial Defense of the Republic of Bosnia and Herzegovina ===
As the situation evolved, the Presidency declared a state of imminent danger of war, leading to the dissolution of the Socialist Republic's Territorial Defense and the formation of the Territorial Defense of the Republic of Bosnia and Herzegovina. This transition established a new headquarters, retained the existing Territorial Defense units and structures, and simultaneously marked the beginning of a new phase in its development. While maintaining legal and historical continuity, this shift signified a critical reorganization to address the growing demands of the war. The main strength of the Territorial Defense lay in its formation process. Following the declaration of imminent danger of war and the subsequent partial mobilization based on the Presidency's decisions, a mass enrollment of volunteers into the Territorial Defense began. A smaller portion of these volunteers arrived at mobilization sites already armed with weapons they had acquired through various means. However, a significant number of volunteers who could not be immediately equipped were registered and sent back home, instructed to await further calls for engagement. Under these circumstances, it was not yet possible to fully control or efficiently manage the organization and deployment of mobilized personnel. Numerous units of varying sizes were formed, ranging from small groups of fighters and divisions to platoons, companies, and detachments. This lack of cohesion further complicated the already fragmented leadership and command structure.

To address this, on April 18, 1992, the Headquarters of the Territorial Defense of the Republic of Bosnia and Herzegovina issued an order for consolidation. This reorganization was to be implemented on a territorial basis while preserving the existing structure. Smaller groups and departments operating within localized areas were merged into platoons. These platoons, including those already established at the level of local communities or settlements, were further consolidated into companies.

At the municipal level, the order called for the creation of larger infantry units at the battalion-detachment level, along with artillery and anti-tank units based on available resources. Additionally, the formation of anti-sabotage units, military police units, and other necessary formations was directed to strengthen overall organizational capacity. At the end of April 1992, the Headquarters of the Territorial Defense of the Republic of Bosnia and Herzegovina headquarters had in its records 268 independent platoons, 269 independent companies and 86 detachments, manned by 76,272 members.

During the transitional period, efforts to further organize and consolidate the forces of the Territorial Defense of the Republic of Bosnia and Herzegovina remained a priority. These activities aimed to enhance the structure and readiness of the defense forces amidst escalating conflict. The situation culminated in the official declaration of a state of war in the Republic on June 20, 1992, marking a significant turning point in the nation's efforts to mobilize and defend its sovereignty. Between April 30 and June 30, 1992, the number of mobilized members of the Territorial Defense of the Republic of Bosnia and Herzegovina surged to 131,528. During this period, the total number of units increased from 676 to 696. This growth was accompanied by a structural reorganization, with a reduction in the number of independent platoons and companies and an expansion in the formation of detachments, battalions, and brigades to enhance operational efficiency and coordination.

=== Army of the Republic Of Bosnia and Herzegovina ===
The transitional period, during which the Territorial Defense functioned as the Army of the Republic of Bosnia and Herzegovina, lasted until July 4, 1992. On that date, the Presidency issued a decision that formally established the organization of the Armed Forces of the Republic of Bosnia and Herzegovina. This decision outlined the formation of headquarters, commands, units, and institutions of the Army, officially putting it into operation and marking the beginning of its gradual development into a structured and cohesive military force. The Territorial Defense of the Republic of Bosnia and Herzegovina officially ceased to exist, as its Headquarters was transformed into the Main Headquarters of the Armed Forces of the Republic of Bosnia and Herzegovina.

During the summer of 1992, as the tasks facing the Army of the Republic of Bosnia and Herzegovina grew increasingly complex, the General Staff drafted a proposal for advancing its organizational and structural development by establishing Army corps as permanent formations. This initiative was seen as a potential strategic turning point, enabling a shift from a primarily defensive posture to combined and large-scale offensive operations aimed at liberating the country. On August 18, 1992, the Presidency adopted the decision to establish corps within the Army of the Republic of Bosnia and Herzegovina, defining their zones of responsibility and command structure. The formation included the 1st Corps, headquartered in Sarajevo; the 2nd Corps, headquartered in Tuzla; the 3rd Corps, initially designated for Banja Luka but operating from a temporary headquarters in Zenica; the 4th Corps, headquartered in Mostar; and the 5th Corps, headquartered in Bihać.

=== Formation ===
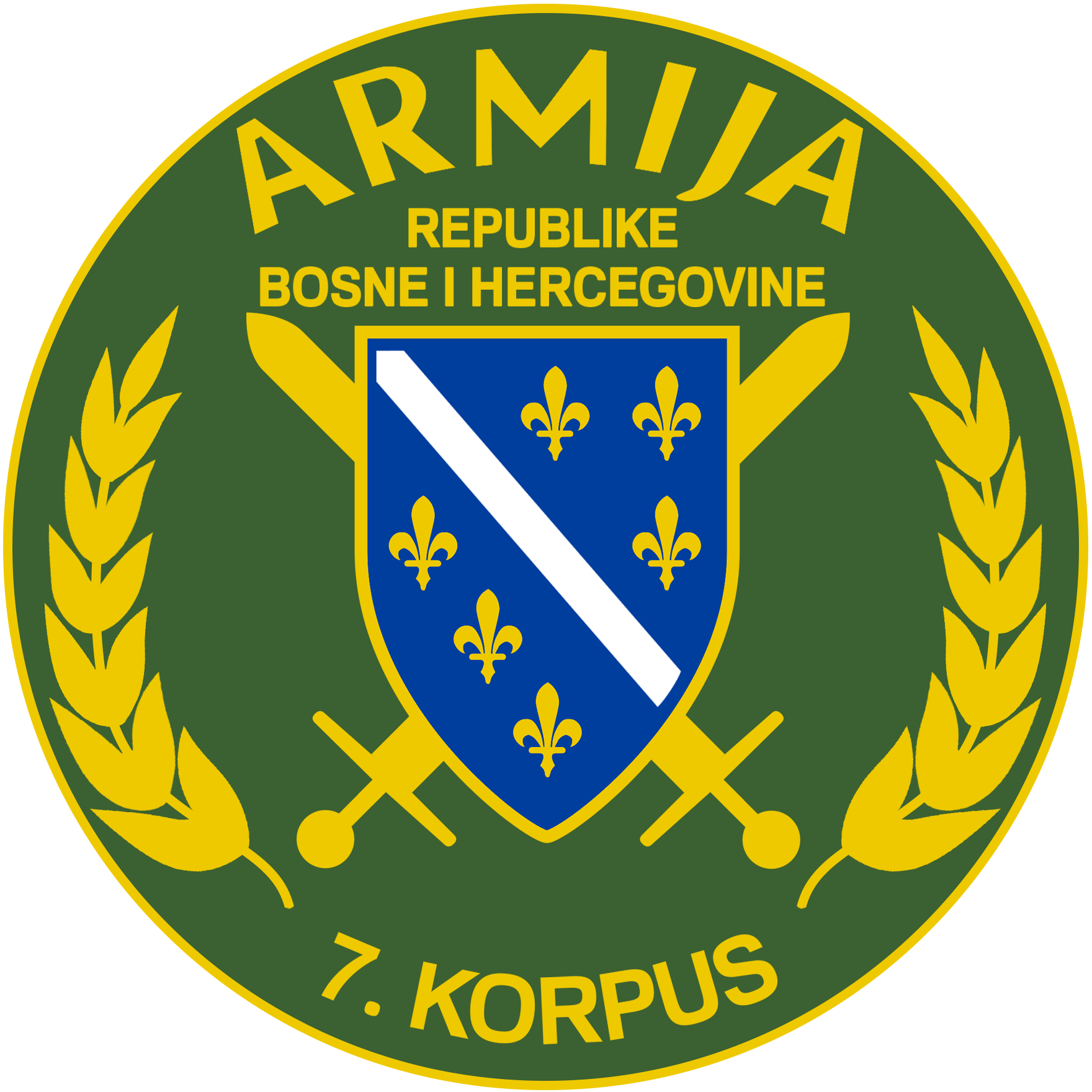
7th Corps – Army of the Republic of Bosnia and Herzegovina – Patch

The idea to form the 7th Corps arose not only from military necessity but also from a political desire to unite the Krajina military element in Central Bosnia under a separate corps. This corps was envisioned to focus its operations on the Bosnian Krajina (Bosnian: Bosanska Krajina). A key moment for the formation occurred on August 21, 1993, in Zenica, during a briefing between members of the Supreme Command and Corps commanders, where preparations for the 7th Corps were initiated.

The Presidency of the Republic of Bosnia and Herzegovina, through Decision No. 02-111-19/94 dated January 11, 1994, officially approved the formation of the 7th Corps. The Headquarters of the Supreme Command of the Armed Forces of Bosnia and Herzegovina subsequently began organizing its establishment. However, ongoing combat operations against two adversaries in the operational zone of the 3rd Corps (the future zone of the 7th Corps) delayed progress until the cessation of hostilities between the Croatian Defence Council and the Army of the Republic of Bosnia and Herzegovina, formalized by the Washington Agreement.

The Presidency officially decided on the formation of the 7th Corps on February 26, 1994. appointing Brigadier General Mehmed Alagić as its commander. The Corps was given the temporary wartime formation number T-412.191, the assigned name T-30009, and the military unit number VJ 5029.

The first official operational report from the 7th Corps Command to the Headquarters of the Supreme Command of the Armed Forces of Bosnia and Herzegovina was sent on April 7, 1994. This date is celebrated as the official formation day of the 7th Corps of the Army of the Republic of Bosnia and Herzegovina.

=== Integration ===
Following the signings of the Washington Agreement on March 18, 1994, which led to the creation of the Federation of Bosnia and Herzegovina and Dayton Agreement on December 14, 1995, the 7th Corps of the Army of the Republic of Bosnia and Herzegovina, along with the Croatian Defence Council, began the process of demobilizing wartime forces. This demobilization marked the beginning of preparations for the transition to peacetime operations and the professionalization of the military. The Defense Law of the Federation of Bosnia and Herzegovina, adopted in late August 1996, provided a framework for the gradual integration of the forces into a unified Army of the Federation of Bosnia and Herzegovina. This integration was successfully completed over the next three years.

=== Reform ===
After the establishment of peace, Bosnia and Herzegovina had three (Army of the Republic of Bosnia and Herzegovina, Croatian Defence Council and Army of Republika Srpska) completely separate armies, which until then were in conflict with each other. Today, after the defense reform of Bosnia and Herzegovina, Armed Forces of Bosnia and Herzegovina are united under a single chain of command and subordinated to civilian authorities, with the Presidency of Bosnia and Herzegovina as the supreme commander.

== Operational Zone ==
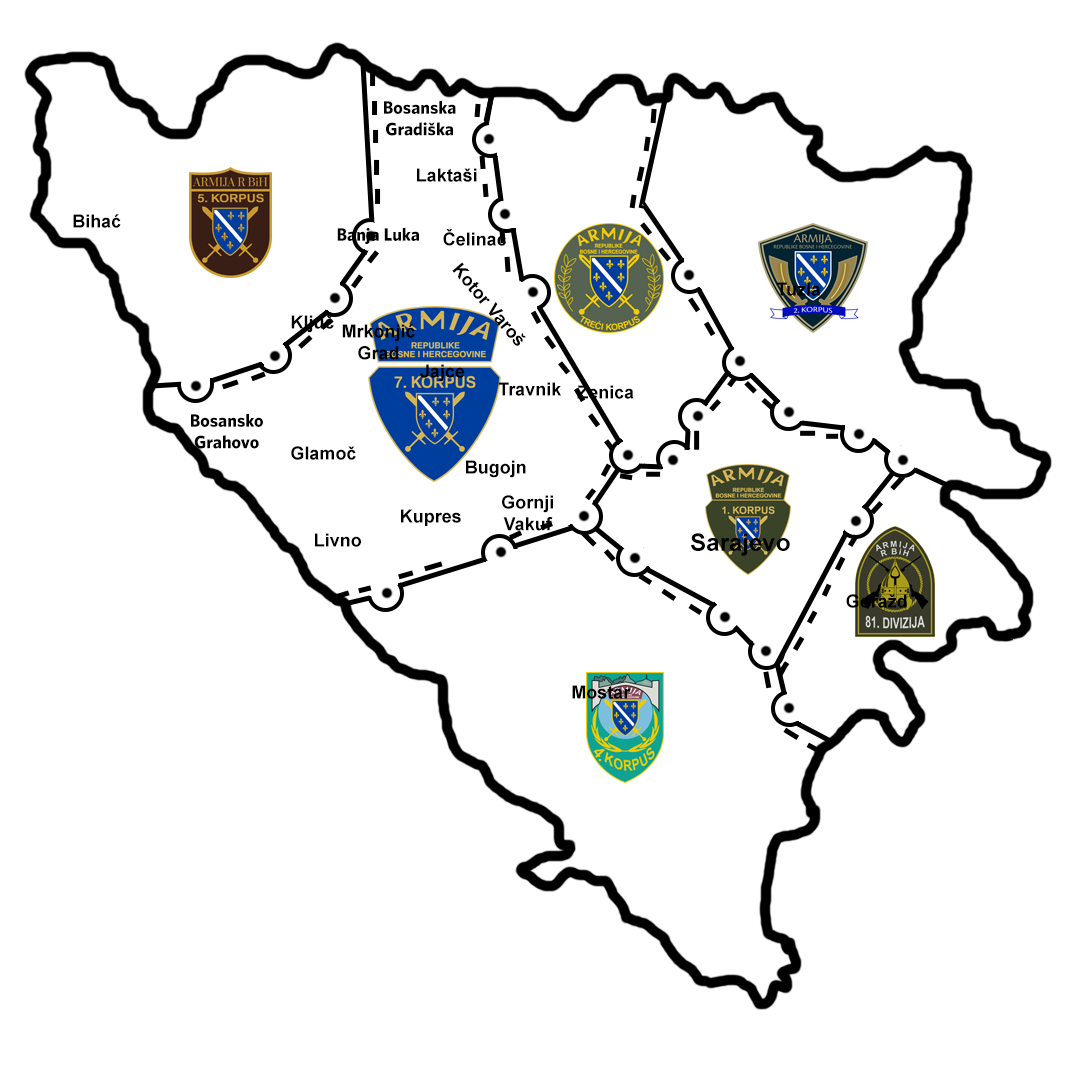
Strategic Layout depicting Operational Zone of the 7th Corps

The main task of the 7th Corps was to carry out combat operations towards the northwestern part of Bosnia and Herzegovina, in the direction of Bosanska Krajina.

The frontline in the operational zone towards the Army of Republika Srpska was about 140 kilometers, and included the Vlasić and Komar-Vrbas tactical directions and the Kupres tactical direction. In addition the 7th Corps was also engaged towards the Croatian Defence Council. The length of the front line in the operational zone towards the Croatian Defence Council was about 120 kilometers, and included the Lašva and Upper Vakuf directions.

Operational zone of the 7th Corps included the following municipalities: Banja Luka, Bosanska Gradiška, Bosansko Grahovo, Bugojno, Čelinac, Donji Vakuf, Gornji Vakuf, Glamoč, Jajce, Kotor Varoš, Kupres, Laktasi, Livno, Mrkonjić Grad, Novi Travnik, Travnik, Vitez, Skender-Vakuf and i Šipovo.

== Personnel ==
As of February 1995, the 7th Corps of the Army of the Republic of Bosnia and Herzegovina had a total of 23,997 permanent personnel, out of the Army of the Republic of Bosnia and Herzegovina overall established strength of 229,823 personnel. The breakdown of the 7th Corps personnel was as follows:

- Commissioned Officers: 1,263
- Non-Commissioned Officers (NCOs): 1,267
- Soldiers: 21,467

This distribution highlights the typical military hierarchy within the corps, with the majority of personnel consisting of soldiers, supported by smaller numbers of officers and NCOs.

=== Leadership ===
The Brigadier General is the highest-ranking officer of the Corps appointed by the Presidency. Due to the constraints placed by the war, the primary role was to organize units and create functioning command structure in the zone of operation. The first and only commander of the 7th Corps was Mehmed Alagić. In 1997, General Mehmed Alagić was awarded with the Order of the Golden Coat of Arms with Swords (Bosnian: Orden Zlatnog grba sa mačevima).

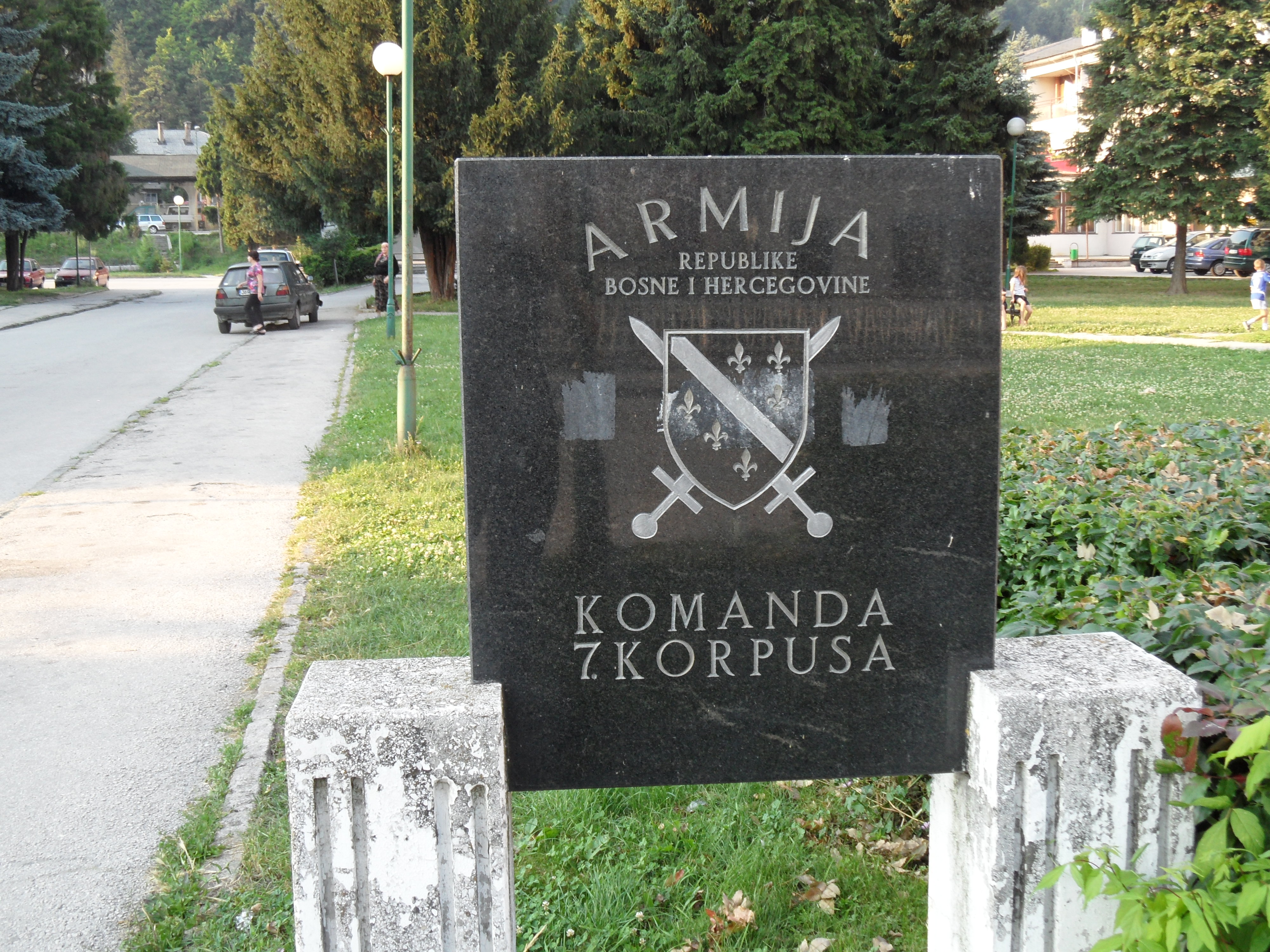
ARBiH 7th Corps headquarters is at Travnik.

A deputy commander is the second-in-command to a commander, acts on the Commander's behalf when required and performs other duties as directed by the Commander. The Deputy Commander of the 7th Corps was Fikret Ćuskić. General Fikret Ćuskić is recipient of the Order of the Golden Lily (Bosnian: Zlatni ljiljan).

- Chief of Staff: Colonel Kadir Jusić
- Assistant Commander for Security: Colonel Ramiz Dugalić
- Assistant Commander for Logistics: Colonel Abdulah Jeleč
- Assistant Commander for Finance: Major Mustafa Šanta
- Chief of Training Department: Major Remzija Šiljak

== 7th Corps units ==
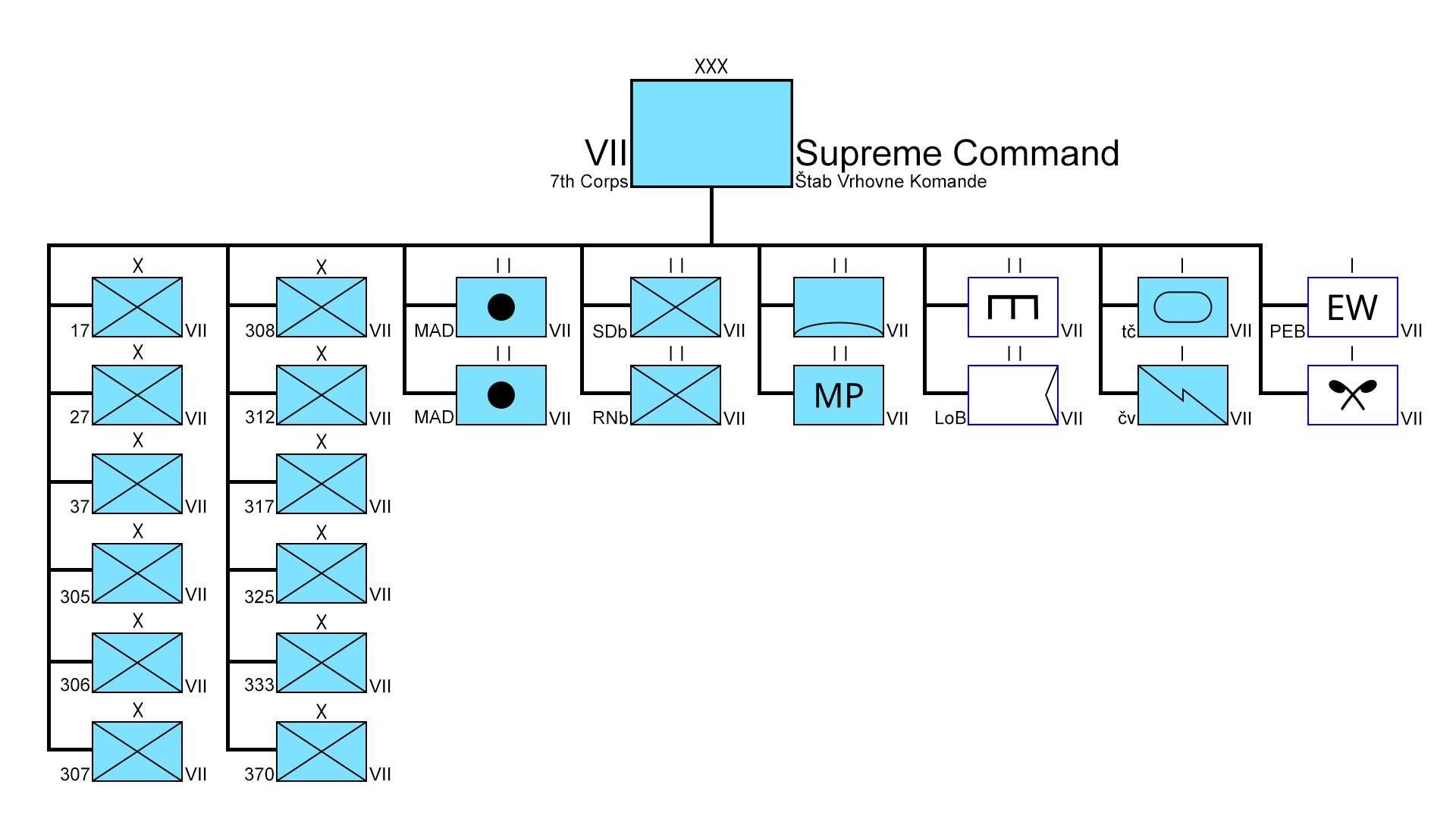
Organizational Chart of the 7th Corps of the Army of the Republic of Bosnia and Herzegovina, April 1994

Despite difficult and complex reality, the command made efforts to form units that would have a maneuver character and capability. The backbone of the maneuver units would be formed primarily from the exiled population from the occupied territories, for example the 17th Krajina Brigade, 305th Jajace Brigade, later 27th Mountain Brigade.

In terms of weaponry, the 7th Corps was a distinctly infantry unit. There were 7 tanks in the Corps. 73 large-caliber artillery pieces, 459 pieces of 82mm and 60mm mortars and over 12,000 infantry firearms.

The 7th Corps was formed from the combat elements of the 3rd Corps, primarily from units of OG "Bosanska Krajina" and OG "Zapad".

The following brigades from the Operational Zone ‘’Bosanska krajina’’ became part of the 7th Corps:

=== 17th Knight's Krajina Mountain Brigade ===
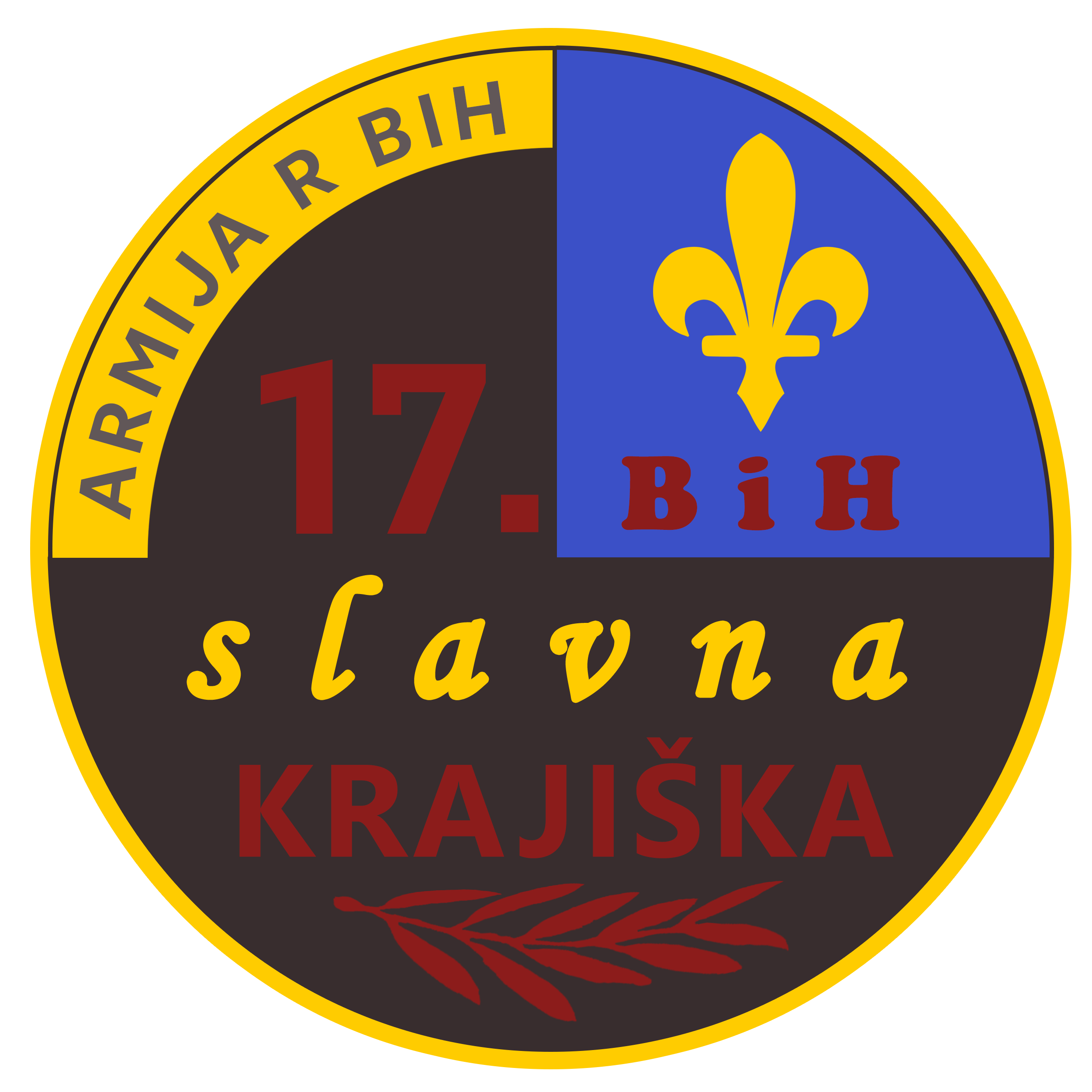
17th Glorious Krajina Mountain Brigade – Patch

The 17th Brigade was formed on 19 November 1992 out of two existing units: the 1st and 7th Brigades (Bosnian: Prve bosansko-krajiške brigade i Sedme krajiške brigade) from Krajina. Its headquarters were in Travnik in the former JNA Barracks. Initially it consisted of two battalions primarily of volunteers and refugees from Krajina and with the arrival of more soldiers the 3rd and 4th battalions were created. Fourth battalion was created from the soldiers of the 84th brigade and the elements of the 1st Kotorvaroš Battalion of HVO. It was a “manoeuvre” brigade within the 3rd Corps and took part in actions all over the territory of Bosnia and Herzegovina. From November 1992 to April 1993, it had 900 men.

On the first anniversary of the formation of the Army of the Republic of Bosnia and Herzegovina, by the Decree of the President of the Presidency of the Republic of Bosnia and Herzegovina, Mr Alija Izetbegović, dated April 14, 1993 for overall contribution made to the preservation of the sovereignty and territorial integrity of the Republic of Bosnia and Herzegovina, the exceptional combat successes they continuously achieve and the courage, determination and dedication of their members shown in the performance of all combat and other tasks, as well as the care and protection of citizens the Brigade received the honorary title Glorious (Bosnian: Slavna)., and in 1995 the honorary title Knight's (Bosnian: Viteška).

Amir Žilić, commander of the 2nd Battalion, was posthumously awarded with the Order of the Golden Coat of Arms with Swords (Bosnian: Orden Zlatnog grba sa mačevima) in 1994 as well as the Order of the Golden Liliy (Bosnian: Zlatni ljiljan) in 1993. He was killed in action on January 6, 1993. Crkvice – Visoko.

- 1st Commander: Fikret Ćuskić (November 19, 1992 – April 7, 1994)
- 2nd Commander: Colonel Sejad Ćirkin
- 3rd Commander: Major Sakib Forić
- Assistant Commander for Security: Esad Grudić

=== 705th Glorious Mountain Brigade (formerly 305th Mountain Brigade) – Jajce ===
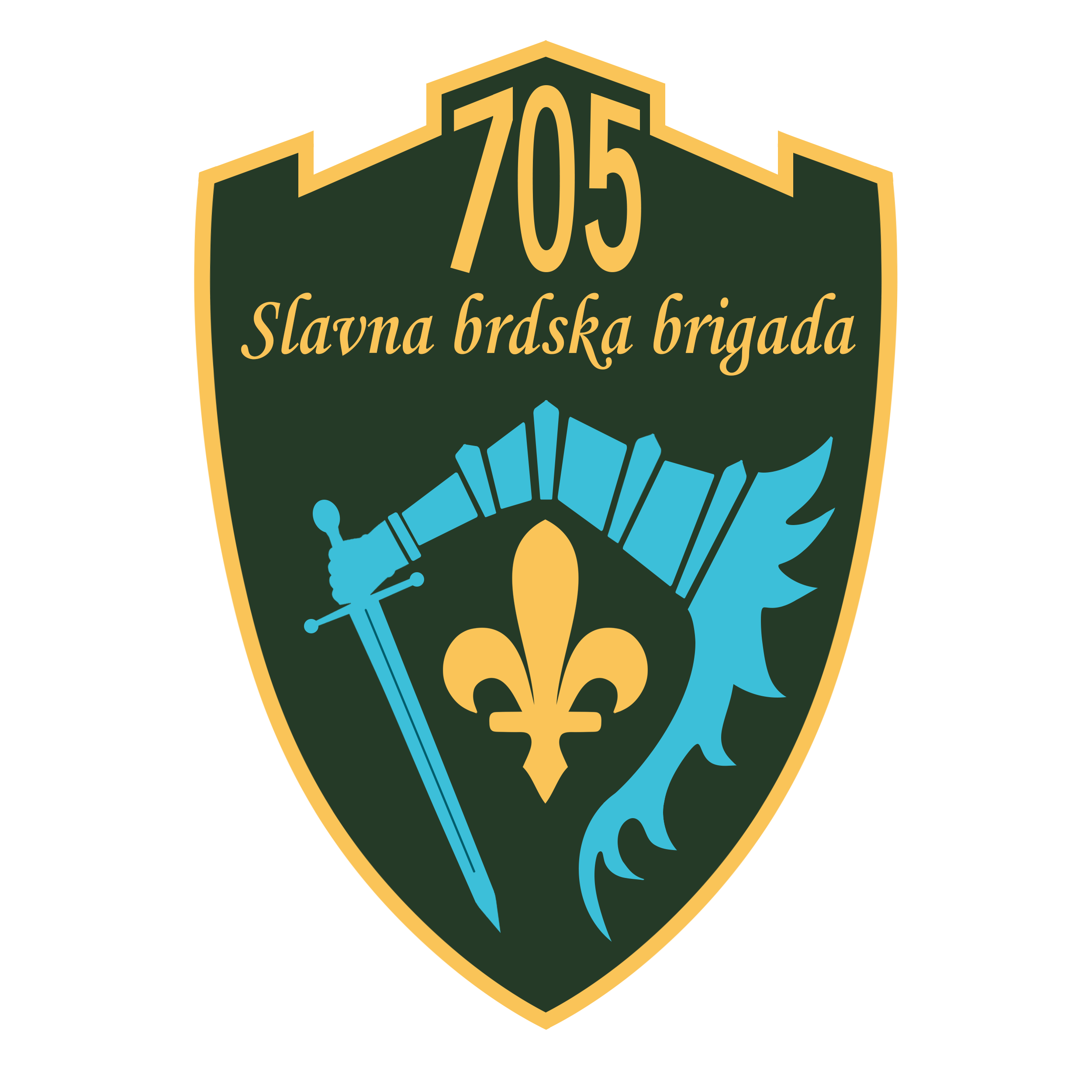
705th Glorious Mountain Brigade – Patch

The 705th brigade was formed on December 1, 1992, in Bugojno. Upon formation, the brigade is stationed in the areas of the municipalities of Bugojno and Gornji Vakuf. It consisted primarily of volunteers and refugees from Jajce and consisted of three battalions.

By the Decree of the President of the Presidency of the Republic of Bosnia and Herzegovina, Mr Alija Izetbegović, dated January 18, 1995 for overall contribution made to the preservation of the sovereignty and territorial integrity of the Republic of Bosnia and Herzegovina, the exceptional combat successes they continuously achieve and the courage, determination and dedication of their members shown in the performance of all combat and other tasks, as well as the care and protection of citizens the 305th along with 307th Brigade received the honorary title Glorious (Bosnian: Slavna).

- 1st Commander: Major Halid Dedić (December 1992 – December 1994)
- 2nd Commander: Major Rifet Planinčić (December 1994 – November 1995)
- 3rd Commander: Major Abid Gromila (November 1995 – April 1996)

=== 706th Mountain Brigade (formerly 306th Mountain Brigade) – Travnik, Han Bila ===
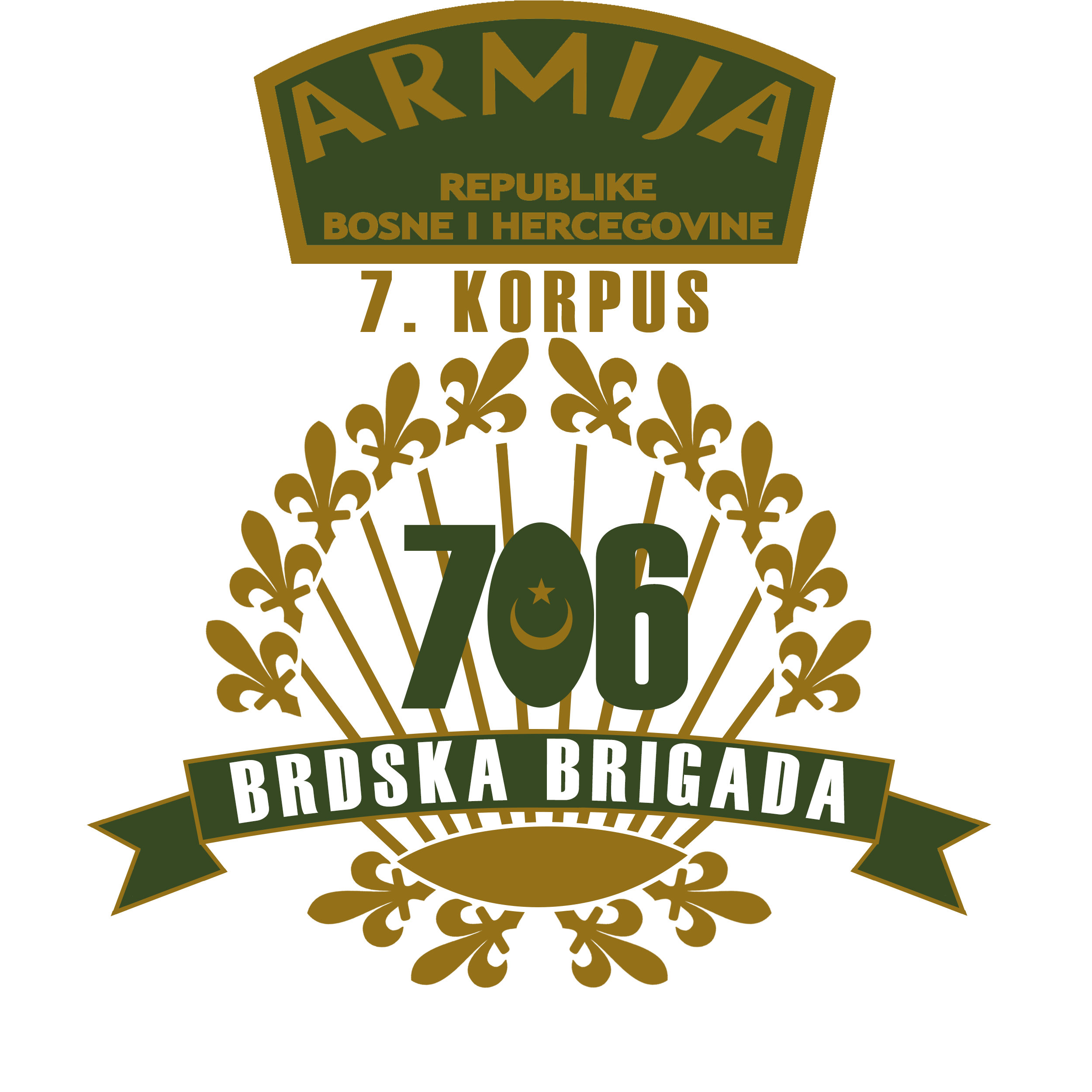
706th Mountain Brigade – Patch

The 306th Brigade was formed on December 20, 1992, and consisted of four battalions, a military police platoon and several other units. In March 1993, the brigade had 1,974 soldiers. The brigade's headquarters were three kilometres from Han Bila, in the mine administration building in Rudnik. The 1st Battalion was based in the elementary school in Mehurići. The 2nd Battalion was stationed in Krpeljići. The 3rd Battalion was deployed in the elementary school in Han Bila. The 4th Battalion was in the village of Višnjevo.

From November 1992 until March 1993, the 306th Brigade was subordinated to the 3rd Corps. In March 1993, when operations groups were created, the 306th Brigade was subordinated to OG Zapad. Then, since the zone of responsibility of the 306th Brigade was too broad, it was subordinated to OG Bosanska Krajina in early June 1993.

Around 3200 soldiers have served in the brigade, 136 soldiers gave their lives, while 450 of them were wounded. 11 soldiers were awarded with "Golden Liliy" (Bosnian: Zlatni ljiljan) and one with "Silver Shield" (Bosnian: Srebrni štit).

- 1st Commander: Esed Sipić (November 18, 1992 – mid-August 1993)
- 2nd Commander: Captain Fahir Čamdžić
- Chief of Staff: Remzija Šiljak (until December 1993)
- Assistant Commander for Security: Asim Delalić
- Assistant Commander for Logistics: Munir Karić
- Assistant Commander for Moral Guidance, Information
- Propaganda and Religious Affairs: Halim Husić (November 1992 – early November 1993)

=== 708th Glorious Mountain Brigade (formerly 308th Mountain Brigade) – Novi Travnik ===
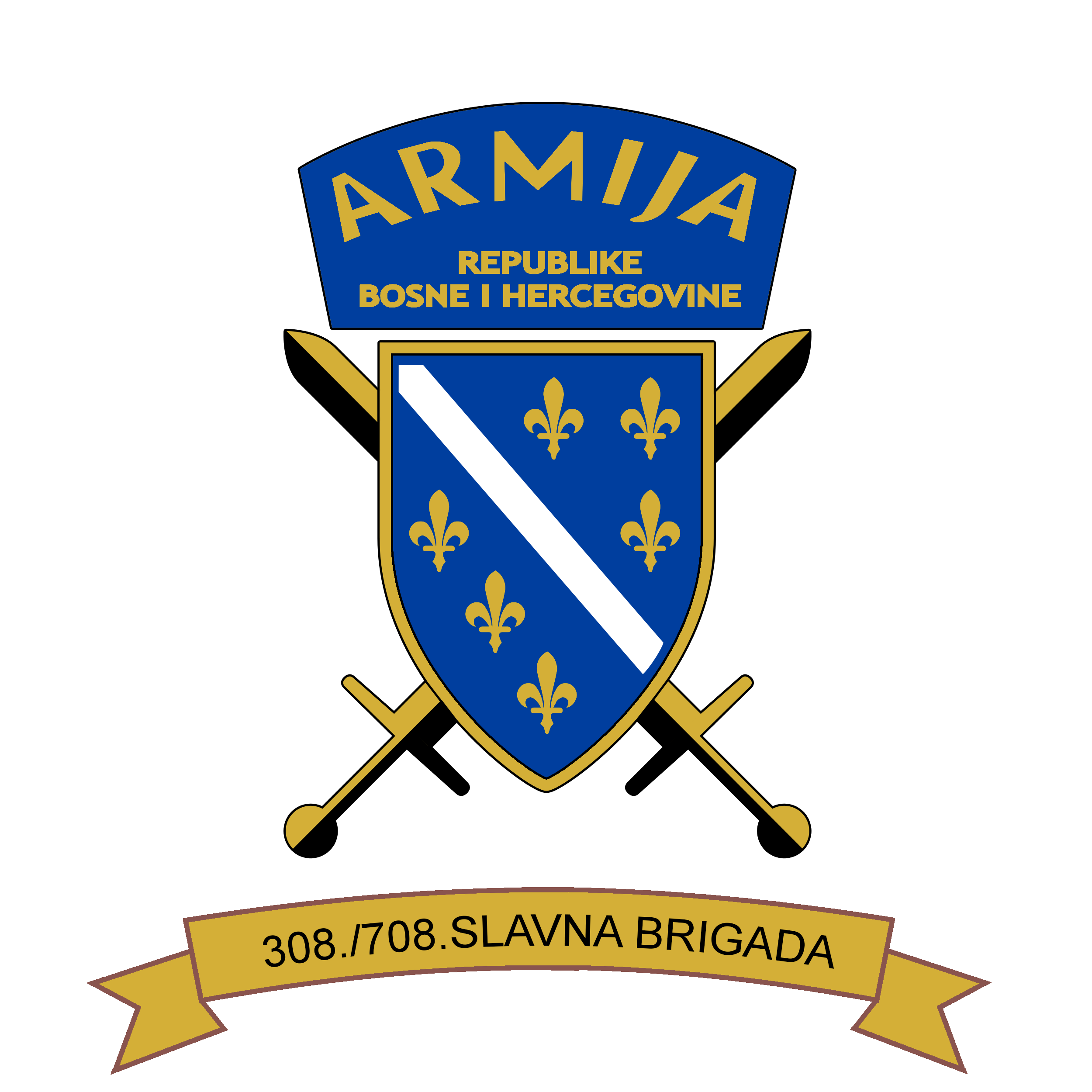
708th Glorious Mountain Brigade – Patch

The brigade was formed on December 17, 1992, in Novi Travnik. The brigade includes the 1st, 2nd and 3rd mountain battalions of the Municipal Defense Headquarters Novi Travnik.

After the end of the hostilities in Bosnia and Herzegovina, as a subsequent evaluation of their overall contribution to the armed struggle or as an evaluation of the contribution in the last phase of the war, by the Decree of the President of the Presidency of the Republic of Bosnia and Herzegovina, Mr Alija Izetbegović, the 708th Mountain Brigade received the honorary title Glorious (Bosnian: Slavna).

- 1st Commander: Major Bislim Zurapi
- 2nd Commander: Colonel Osman Porić (Killed in action October 13, 1995. Mulež – Ključ) Posthumously awarded the Order of the Golden Lily (Bosnian: Zlatni ljiljan).
- 3rd Commander Major Selim Zahirović

=== 712th Glorious Mountain Brigade (formerly 312th Mountain Brigade) – Travnik ===
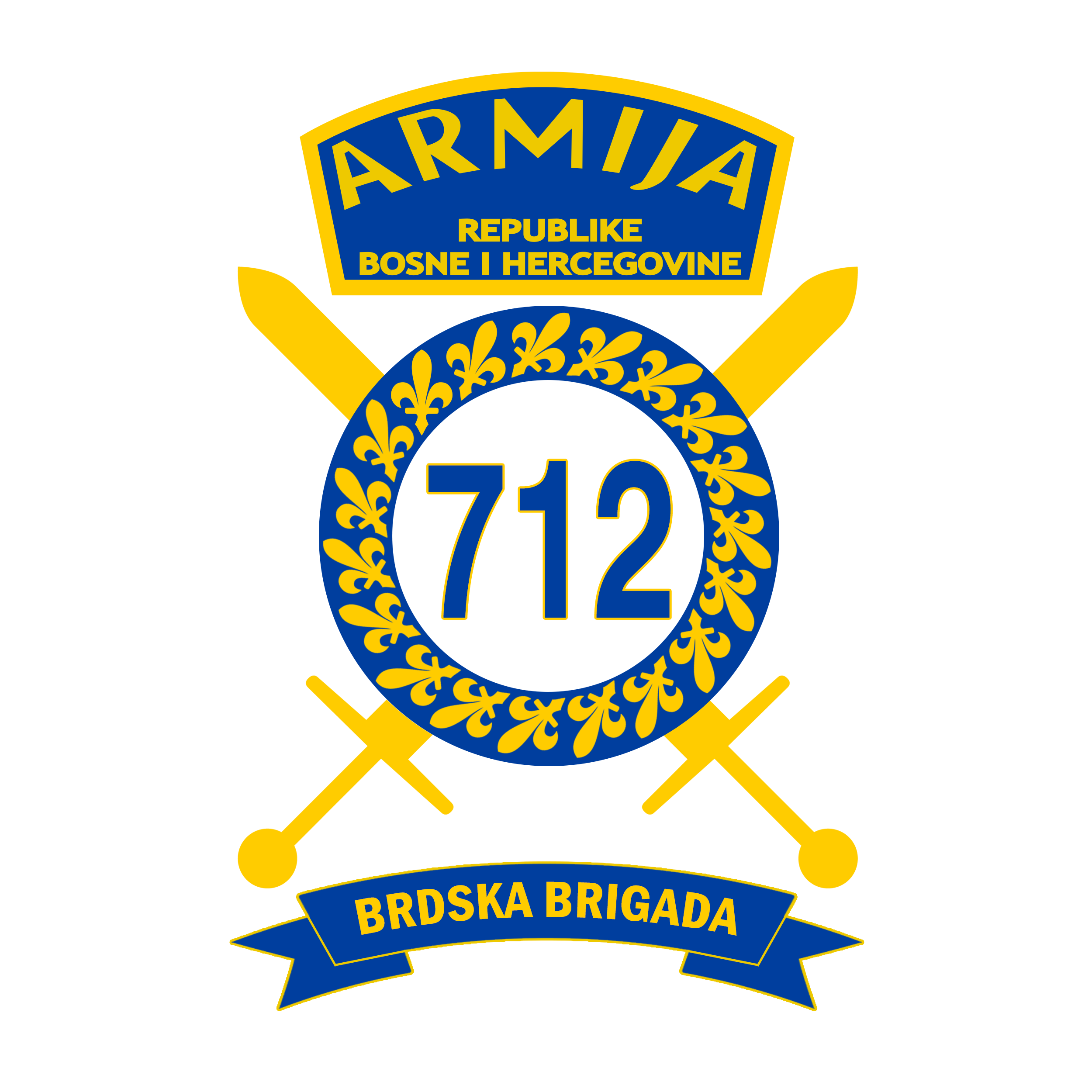
712th Mountain Brigade – Patch

The brigade was formed on November 25, 1992, as 312th Motorized Brigade, which was later renamed and organized as a Mountain Brigade. The brigade was formed from the First and Second Travnik detachments (Bosnian: Prvi i Drugi travnički odred), the Vlašić detachment (former Mudrič company) (Bosnian: Vlašićki odred (bivša Mudrička četa)), the Turbet detachment (Bosnian: Turbetski odred), the Gradina detachment (Bosnian: Odred Gradina) and the Karaula detachment (Bosnian: Karaulski odred). After the end of the hostilities in Bosnia and Herzegovina, as a subsequent evaluation of their overall contribution to the armed struggle or as an evaluation of the contribution in the last phase of the war, by the Decree of the President of the Presidency of the Republic of Bosnia and Herzegovina, Mr Alija Izetbegović, the 712th Mountain Brigade received the honorary title Glorious (Bosnian: Slavna).

Over 6500 soldiers have served in the brigade 282 soldiers gave their lives, 9 soldiers were awarded with the Order of the Golden Liliy (Bosnian: Zlatni ljiljan). Major Mihajlo Petrović, commander of the Mudrič Company (Bosnian: Mudrička četa) and the Vlašić Detachment (Bosnian: Vlašićki odred), was posthumously awarded with the Order of the Golden Coat of Arms with Swords (Bosnian: Orden Zlatnog grba sa mačevima) in 1994 as well as the Order of the Golden Liliy (Bosnian: Zlatni ljiljan) in 1992.

- 1st Commander: Major Zijad Čaber
- 2nd Commander: Kenan Dautović

=== 725th Mountain Brigade (formerly 325th Mountain Brigade) – Vitez ===
The brigade was formed on December 1, 1992, in the municipality of Vitez, in the town of Kruščica. The units of 7 regional headquarters and two volunteer detachments, which existed since May 21, 1992, became part of the brigade. In the beginning, it had two battalions and a platoon of the Military Police, with a total of 800 soldiers.

- 1st Commander: Captain 1st class Esad Džananović (from formation of the unit until April 16, 1993)
- 2nd Commander: Colonel Mensur Keleštura
- 3rd Commander: Captain 1st class Ibrahim Purić
- 4th Commander: Colonel Rifet Planinčić
- 5th Commander: Major Mevludin Berberović
- 6th Commander: Colonel Ahmed Kulenović
- 7th Commander: Major Nesad Hurem

=== 727th Mountain Brigade (formerly 27th Mountain Brigade) – Gluha Bukovica ===
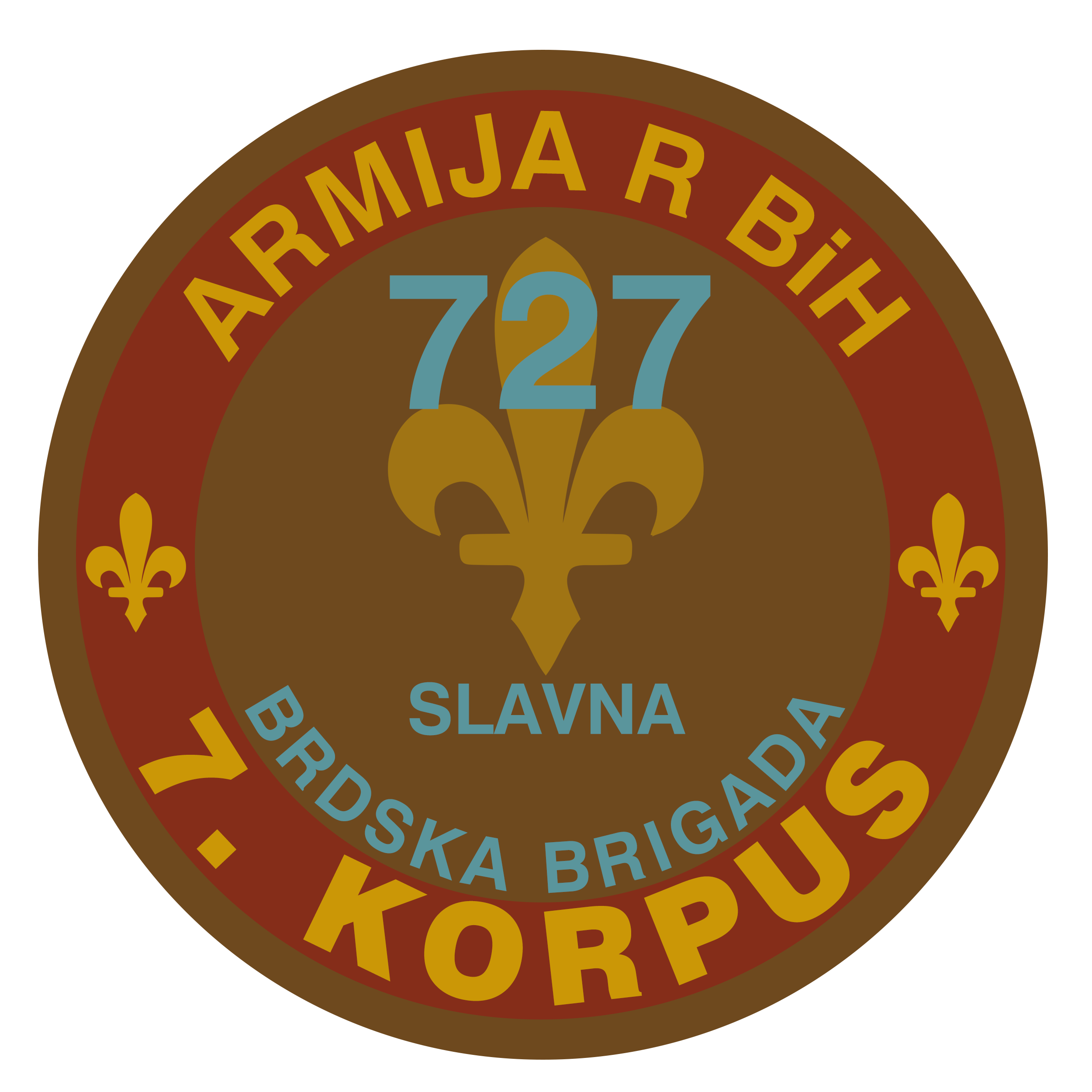
727th Glorious Mountain Brigade – Patch

The brigade was formed on August 15, 1993, from the units of the 27th motorized brigade, 1st battalion 306th mountain brigade and 4th battalion 314th motorized brigade. The brigade included soldiers from 33 municipalities of Bosnia and Herzegovina.

On January 18, 1995, by the Decree of the President of the Presidency of the Republic of Bosnia and Herzegovina, Mr Alija Izetbegović, for overall contribution made to the preservation of the sovereignty and territorial integrity of the Republic of Bosnia and Herzegovina, the exceptional combat successes they continuously achieve and the courage, determination and dedication of their members shown in the performance of all combat and other tasks, as well as the care and protection of citizens the 307th along with 305th Brigade received the honorary title Glorious (Bosnian: Slavna).

- 1st Commander: Colonel Rasim Imamović
- 2nd Commander: Major Mustafa Fazlić – Awarded with the Order of the Golden Lily (Bosnian: Zlatni ljiljan), December 31, 1994.

=== 737th Muslim Light Brigade (formerly 37th Light Brigade) – Travnik ===
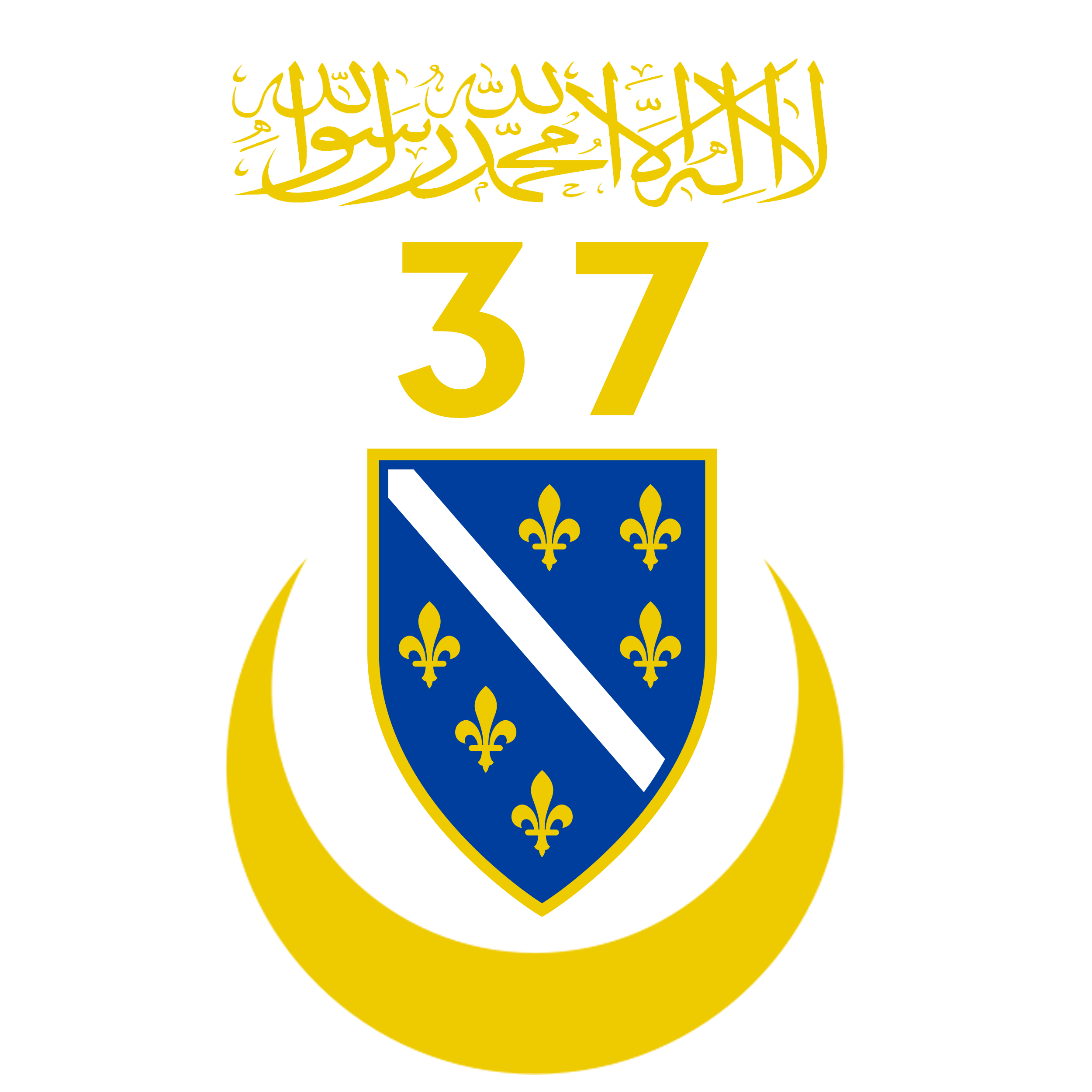
737th Muslim Light Brigade – Patch

The brigade was formed on February 15, 1994, in Travnik. It was formed from the units of the 1st battalion of the 7th Muslim Brigade.

- 1st Commander: Colonel Asim Koričić
- 2nd Commander: Major Vahid Dervišić

The following brigades from the Operational Zone ‘’Zapad’’ became part of the 7th Corps:

=== 707th Glorious Mountain Brigade (formerly 307th Mountain Brigade) – Bugojno ===
As a result of the restructuring of the 307th Motorized Brigade and units of the Municipal Headquarters of the Bugojno defense, on October 21, 1993, the 307th Mountain Brigade was created. It was based in Bugojno and consisted of four battalions, military police unit and anti-sabotage units. As of March 08, 1993, the 307th Brigade was subordinated to the Operational Zone ‘’Zapad’’. The brigade consisted of a total of 1,667 soldiers. On November 03, 1994 part of 707th Mountain Brigade was the first to enter the center of Kupres. On January 18, 1995 by the Decree of the President of the Presidency of the Republic of Bosnia and Herzegovina, Mr Alija Izetbegović, for overall contribution made to the preservation of the sovereignty and territorial integrity of the Republic of Bosnia and Herzegovina, the exceptional combat successes they continuously achieve and the courage, determination and dedication of their members shown in the performance of all combat and other tasks, as well as the care and protection of citizens the 307th along with 305th Brigade received the honorary title Glorious (Bosnian: Slavna).

- 1st Commander: Tahir Granić (November 18, 1992 – end of October 1993)
- 2nd Commander: Colonel Almir Idrizović
- 3rd Commander: Major Faruk Aganović aka Jupi

=== 717th Mountain Brigade (formerly 317th Mountain Brigade) – Gornji Vakuf ===
The brigade was created on November 11, 1992 from the units of Territorial Defence (“TO”) in Gornji Vakuf, which comprised four battalions.

1st Battalion was formed local communities of Gornji Vakuf I and II, Uzričje, Duša, Paloč, Odvode, Batuša, Vrse and Ždrimci. The battalion headquarters was located in the ball bearing factory. Commander of the battalion was Edin Šero.

2nd Battalion was formed from local communities of Voljevac and Boljkovac and battalion headquarters was located in Voljevac school building. Commander of the battalion was Bedrudin Milanović (Killed in action August 8, 1993. Crni Vrh – Gornji Vakuf) Posthumously awarded the Order of the Golden Lily (Bosnian: Zlatni ljiljan).

3rd Battalion from local communities of Drazev dolac, Duradbegov dolac and Voljice, battalion headquarters was in the primary school building in Voljice. Commander of the battalion was Mehmed Redžebašić.

4th Battalion local communities of Grnica, Bojska, Bistrica, Hrasnica and Lužani, battalion headquarters was in thebuilding of primary school Grnica. Commander of the battalion was Abduselam Redžebašić.

On December 14, 1993, by the Decree of the President of the Presidency of the Republic of Bosnia and Herzegovina, Mr Alija Izetbegović, for overall contribution made to the preservation of the sovereignty and territorial integrity of the Republic of Bosnia and Herzegovina, the exceptional combat successes they continuously achieve and the courage, determination and dedication of their members shown in the performance of all combat and other tasks, as well as the care and protection of citizens the Brigade received the honorary title Glorious (Bosnian: Slavna).

- 1st Commander: Brigadier Fahrudin Agić – Pajo, (Territorial Defence (“TO”) – Gornji Vakuf)
- 2nd Commander: Major Džemal Hadžić
- Chief of Staff: Goran Čišić (Killed in action December 20, 1994. Podripc – Bugojno as commander of the Sabotage Battalion of the 7th Corps in the rank of Captain 1st), in 1995 posthumously awarded the Order of the Golden Lily (Bosnian: Zlatni ljiljan).

=== 770th Glorious Mountain Brigade (formerly 370th Mountain Brigade) – Donji Vakuf ===
The brigade was formed on October 21, 1993, in Bugojno. The brigade included parts of the units of the 307th mtbr, from the area of the municipality of Donji Vakuf, a small part of other municipalities and units of the disbanded Municipal Headquarters of Defense of Donji Vakuf. On April 14, 1994, the brigade was awarded the honorary title Glorious (Bosnian: Slavna) for its success.

- 1st Commander: Colonel Senad Alkić
- 2nd Commander: Major Besim Učambarlić
- 3rd Commander: Colonel Amer Duraković

Later on:

=== 733rd Mountain Brigade (formerly 333rd Mountain Brigade) – (Kaćuni) Busovača ===
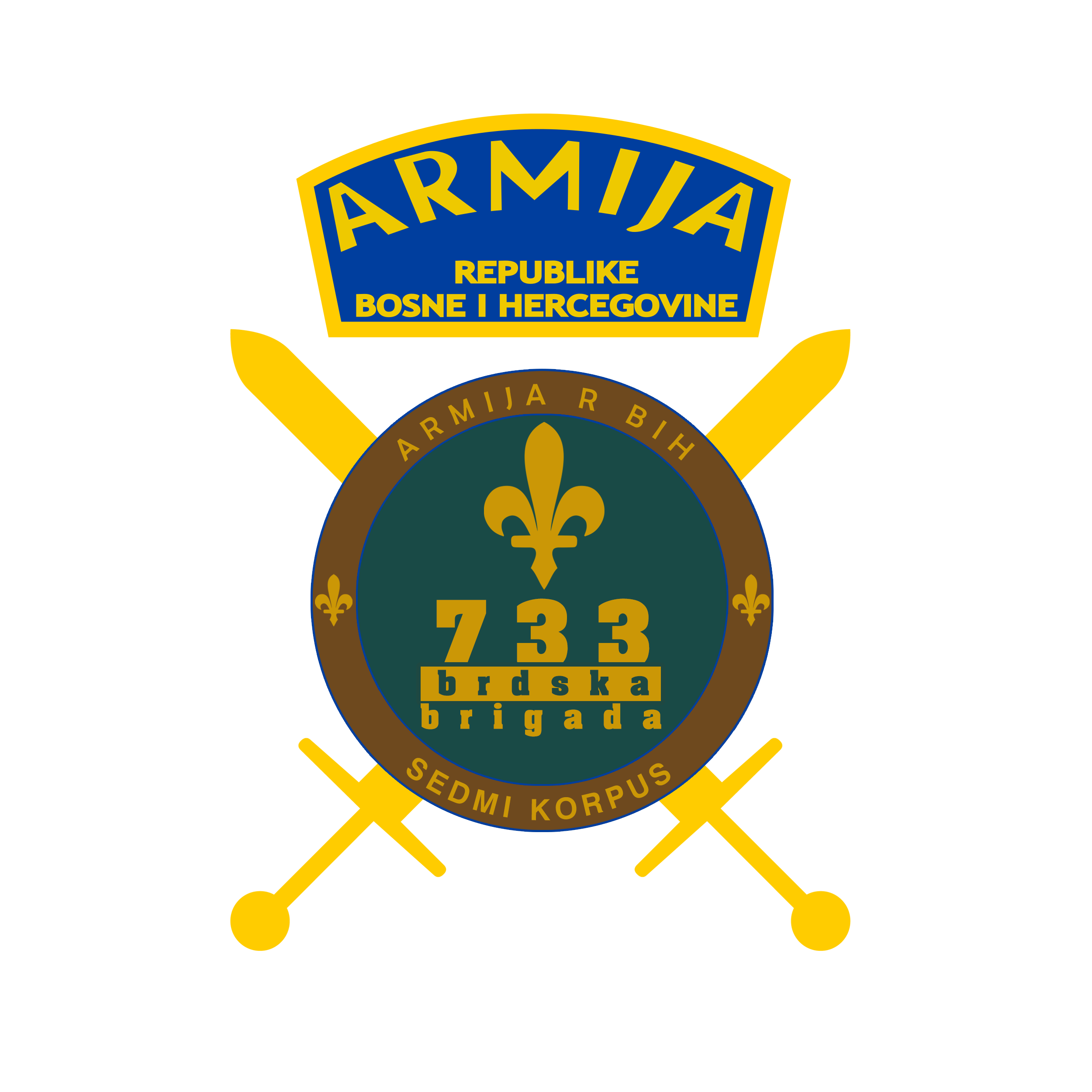
733rd Mountain Brigade – Patch

The brigade was formed on December 1, 1992. The brigade had three mountain battalions, two mountain battalions were formed from conscripts from the area of the municipality of Busovača and one mountain battalion from conscripts from the area municipality of Kakanj. The brigade consisted of a total of 1,940 soldiers.

- 1st Commander: Major Ekrem Alihodžić
- 2nd Commander: Dževad Mekić

=== Freedom (Magazine) ===
Freedom (Bosnian: Sloboda) was the official magazine of the 7th Corps of the Army of the Republic of Bosnia and Herzegovina. First published on June 17, 1994, and last, twentieth issue, was published on January 17, 1996. The magazine was published in Travnik, headquarters of the Command of the 7th Corps of the Army of the Republic of Bosnia and Herzegovina in A3 format, later reprinted in A4 format. The first two issues were printed in the printing house "AB Tisak" Travnik (this printing house was enlisted for the needs of the 7th Corps), however, due to the publishing needs and technical reasons required that the other eighteen issues of "Sloboda" be printed in the printing and publishing company "Borac" Travnik.

The mission of Sloboda was to affirm the goals of the defense and struggle for liberation, however, there were also critically intoned articles. A typical issue of "Sloboda" provided analysis of military operations of the 7th Corps, at the same time, it contained articles with important military-political commentary, interviews with the troops, unit and individual activities and achievements, history and sport. In twenty issues of the magazine "Sloboda" as many as 916 articles, 799 authentic photos and illustrations were published, whose authors were mainly journalists (and associates) from the 7th corps.
