= Miletići =

- Village
- Location within Bosnia and Herzegovina
- Coordinates: 44.2783749°N 17.7401288°E
- Country: Bosnia and Herzegovina
- Entity: Federation of Bosnia and Herzegovina
- Canton: Central Bosnia
- Municipality: Travnik

Area
  - Total: 4.94 sq mi (12.79 km^{2})

Population (2013)
  - Total: 118
  - Density: 23.9/sq mi (9.23/km^{2})
- Time zone: UTC+1 (CET)
  - Summer (DST): UTC+2 (CEST)

Miletići is a village in the municipality of Travnik, Bosnia and Herzegovina.

== Demographics ==
According to the 2013 census, its population was 118, made up entirely of Bosniaks.
